

427001–427100 

|-bgcolor=#d6d6d6
| 427001 ||  || — || April 25, 2007 || Kitt Peak || Spacewatch || — || align=right | 3.5 km || 
|-id=002 bgcolor=#E9E9E9
| 427002 ||  || — || November 12, 2006 || Mount Lemmon || Mount Lemmon Survey || — || align=right | 1.2 km || 
|-id=003 bgcolor=#d6d6d6
| 427003 ||  || — || July 29, 2008 || Mount Lemmon || Mount Lemmon Survey || — || align=right | 3.0 km || 
|-id=004 bgcolor=#E9E9E9
| 427004 ||  || — || November 17, 2006 || Mount Lemmon || Mount Lemmon Survey || — || align=right data-sort-value="0.97" | 970 m || 
|-id=005 bgcolor=#fefefe
| 427005 ||  || — || December 4, 2007 || Catalina || CSS || — || align=right data-sort-value="0.71" | 710 m || 
|-id=006 bgcolor=#E9E9E9
| 427006 ||  || — || September 4, 2010 || Kitt Peak || Spacewatch || — || align=right | 1.7 km || 
|-id=007 bgcolor=#E9E9E9
| 427007 ||  || — || June 8, 2005 || Siding Spring || SSS || — || align=right | 2.1 km || 
|-id=008 bgcolor=#fefefe
| 427008 ||  || — || June 20, 2010 || Mount Lemmon || Mount Lemmon Survey || MAS || align=right data-sort-value="0.78" | 780 m || 
|-id=009 bgcolor=#E9E9E9
| 427009 ||  || — || April 6, 2008 || Kitt Peak || Spacewatch || — || align=right | 1.1 km || 
|-id=010 bgcolor=#E9E9E9
| 427010 ||  || — || December 3, 2010 || Mount Lemmon || Mount Lemmon Survey || — || align=right | 1.0 km || 
|-id=011 bgcolor=#fefefe
| 427011 ||  || — || December 18, 2007 || Mount Lemmon || Mount Lemmon Survey || — || align=right data-sort-value="0.88" | 880 m || 
|-id=012 bgcolor=#d6d6d6
| 427012 ||  || — || March 4, 2006 || Kitt Peak || Spacewatch || — || align=right | 3.7 km || 
|-id=013 bgcolor=#d6d6d6
| 427013 ||  || — || May 20, 2006 || Kitt Peak || Spacewatch || EMA || align=right | 3.6 km || 
|-id=014 bgcolor=#E9E9E9
| 427014 ||  || — || December 14, 2001 || Kitt Peak || Spacewatch || — || align=right | 1.4 km || 
|-id=015 bgcolor=#d6d6d6
| 427015 ||  || — || May 24, 2006 || Kitt Peak || Spacewatch || — || align=right | 3.1 km || 
|-id=016 bgcolor=#E9E9E9
| 427016 ||  || — || October 1, 2005 || Catalina || CSS || — || align=right | 1.8 km || 
|-id=017 bgcolor=#E9E9E9
| 427017 ||  || — || July 14, 2009 || Kitt Peak || Spacewatch || — || align=right | 1.5 km || 
|-id=018 bgcolor=#d6d6d6
| 427018 ||  || — || October 20, 2003 || Socorro || LINEAR || — || align=right | 3.6 km || 
|-id=019 bgcolor=#E9E9E9
| 427019 ||  || — || December 9, 2010 || Catalina || CSS || MAR || align=right | 1.5 km || 
|-id=020 bgcolor=#d6d6d6
| 427020 ||  || — || January 15, 2005 || Kitt Peak || Spacewatch || — || align=right | 2.8 km || 
|-id=021 bgcolor=#fefefe
| 427021 ||  || — || November 23, 2003 || Kitt Peak || Spacewatch || — || align=right | 1.1 km || 
|-id=022 bgcolor=#fefefe
| 427022 ||  || — || March 1, 2008 || Mount Lemmon || Mount Lemmon Survey || V || align=right data-sort-value="0.72" | 720 m || 
|-id=023 bgcolor=#d6d6d6
| 427023 ||  || — || September 10, 2008 || Siding Spring || SSS || criticalTj (2.95) || align=right | 2.5 km || 
|-id=024 bgcolor=#E9E9E9
| 427024 ||  || — || March 27, 2008 || Mount Lemmon || Mount Lemmon Survey || — || align=right | 1.8 km || 
|-id=025 bgcolor=#d6d6d6
| 427025 ||  || — || November 30, 2005 || Kitt Peak || Spacewatch || — || align=right | 2.7 km || 
|-id=026 bgcolor=#E9E9E9
| 427026 ||  || — || August 28, 2005 || Anderson Mesa || LONEOS || — || align=right | 1.5 km || 
|-id=027 bgcolor=#d6d6d6
| 427027 ||  || — || September 16, 2003 || Kitt Peak || Spacewatch || — || align=right | 3.0 km || 
|-id=028 bgcolor=#d6d6d6
| 427028 ||  || — || October 22, 2003 || Kitt Peak || Spacewatch || EOS || align=right | 1.9 km || 
|-id=029 bgcolor=#fefefe
| 427029 ||  || — || November 15, 2003 || Kitt Peak || Spacewatch || NYS || align=right data-sort-value="0.57" | 570 m || 
|-id=030 bgcolor=#d6d6d6
| 427030 ||  || — || September 23, 2008 || Kitt Peak || Spacewatch || — || align=right | 2.9 km || 
|-id=031 bgcolor=#E9E9E9
| 427031 ||  || — || April 14, 2008 || Mount Lemmon || Mount Lemmon Survey || — || align=right | 1.4 km || 
|-id=032 bgcolor=#d6d6d6
| 427032 ||  || — || January 30, 2011 || Mount Lemmon || Mount Lemmon Survey || — || align=right | 3.6 km || 
|-id=033 bgcolor=#d6d6d6
| 427033 ||  || — || September 29, 2008 || Mount Lemmon || Mount Lemmon Survey || — || align=right | 1.9 km || 
|-id=034 bgcolor=#d6d6d6
| 427034 ||  || — || April 20, 2007 || Kitt Peak || Spacewatch || — || align=right | 3.0 km || 
|-id=035 bgcolor=#E9E9E9
| 427035 ||  || — || September 24, 2000 || Anderson Mesa || LONEOS || — || align=right | 2.5 km || 
|-id=036 bgcolor=#E9E9E9
| 427036 ||  || — || December 15, 2006 || Kitt Peak || Spacewatch || — || align=right | 1.3 km || 
|-id=037 bgcolor=#fefefe
| 427037 ||  || — || November 24, 2003 || Kitt Peak || Spacewatch || MAS || align=right data-sort-value="0.88" | 880 m || 
|-id=038 bgcolor=#E9E9E9
| 427038 ||  || — || September 30, 2005 || Mount Lemmon || Mount Lemmon Survey || NEM || align=right | 2.3 km || 
|-id=039 bgcolor=#E9E9E9
| 427039 ||  || — || October 27, 2005 || Mount Lemmon || Mount Lemmon Survey || HOF || align=right | 2.7 km || 
|-id=040 bgcolor=#fefefe
| 427040 ||  || — || October 7, 2004 || Anderson Mesa || LONEOS || — || align=right data-sort-value="0.81" | 810 m || 
|-id=041 bgcolor=#fefefe
| 427041 ||  || — || September 10, 2007 || Catalina || CSS || — || align=right data-sort-value="0.73" | 730 m || 
|-id=042 bgcolor=#d6d6d6
| 427042 ||  || — || March 9, 2005 || Catalina || CSS || EOS || align=right | 2.8 km || 
|-id=043 bgcolor=#E9E9E9
| 427043 ||  || — || December 16, 1993 || Kitt Peak || Spacewatch || — || align=right | 1.5 km || 
|-id=044 bgcolor=#E9E9E9
| 427044 ||  || — || September 14, 2005 || Kitt Peak || Spacewatch ||  || align=right | 1.4 km || 
|-id=045 bgcolor=#d6d6d6
| 427045 ||  || — || March 25, 2006 || Kitt Peak || Spacewatch || EOS || align=right | 2.1 km || 
|-id=046 bgcolor=#E9E9E9
| 427046 ||  || — || October 25, 2005 || Kitt Peak || Spacewatch || — || align=right | 2.2 km || 
|-id=047 bgcolor=#E9E9E9
| 427047 ||  || — || May 3, 2008 || Mount Lemmon || Mount Lemmon Survey || — || align=right | 2.6 km || 
|-id=048 bgcolor=#d6d6d6
| 427048 ||  || — || January 13, 2000 || Kitt Peak || Spacewatch || — || align=right | 3.6 km || 
|-id=049 bgcolor=#E9E9E9
| 427049 ||  || — || October 29, 2005 || Catalina || CSS || — || align=right | 2.7 km || 
|-id=050 bgcolor=#E9E9E9
| 427050 ||  || — || January 15, 1999 || Kitt Peak || Spacewatch || — || align=right | 1.1 km || 
|-id=051 bgcolor=#E9E9E9
| 427051 ||  || — || August 24, 2001 || Anderson Mesa || LONEOS || — || align=right | 1.3 km || 
|-id=052 bgcolor=#E9E9E9
| 427052 ||  || — || November 5, 2005 || Kitt Peak || Spacewatch || WIT || align=right data-sort-value="0.86" | 860 m || 
|-id=053 bgcolor=#E9E9E9
| 427053 ||  || — || November 24, 2000 || Kitt Peak || Spacewatch || AGN || align=right | 1.2 km || 
|-id=054 bgcolor=#E9E9E9
| 427054 ||  || — || January 10, 2011 || Kitt Peak || Spacewatch || HOF || align=right | 2.8 km || 
|-id=055 bgcolor=#E9E9E9
| 427055 ||  || — || September 27, 2009 || Mount Lemmon || Mount Lemmon Survey || — || align=right | 2.2 km || 
|-id=056 bgcolor=#fefefe
| 427056 ||  || — || December 18, 2004 || Mount Lemmon || Mount Lemmon Survey || — || align=right data-sort-value="0.80" | 800 m || 
|-id=057 bgcolor=#E9E9E9
| 427057 ||  || — || December 2, 2005 || Kitt Peak || Spacewatch ||  || align=right | 2.9 km || 
|-id=058 bgcolor=#E9E9E9
| 427058 ||  || — || November 11, 2010 || Kitt Peak || Spacewatch || EUN || align=right | 1.4 km || 
|-id=059 bgcolor=#fefefe
| 427059 ||  || — || November 17, 2007 || Kitt Peak || Spacewatch || — || align=right | 1.3 km || 
|-id=060 bgcolor=#fefefe
| 427060 ||  || — || February 11, 2008 || Kitt Peak || Spacewatch || (6769) || align=right data-sort-value="0.69" | 690 m || 
|-id=061 bgcolor=#d6d6d6
| 427061 ||  || — || December 20, 2009 || Kitt Peak || Spacewatch || — || align=right | 3.3 km || 
|-id=062 bgcolor=#E9E9E9
| 427062 ||  || — || March 29, 2008 || Kitt Peak || Spacewatch || — || align=right | 1.4 km || 
|-id=063 bgcolor=#d6d6d6
| 427063 ||  || — || November 10, 2009 || Kitt Peak || Spacewatch || — || align=right | 3.5 km || 
|-id=064 bgcolor=#E9E9E9
| 427064 ||  || — || November 8, 2010 || Kitt Peak || Spacewatch || — || align=right | 1.2 km || 
|-id=065 bgcolor=#E9E9E9
| 427065 ||  || — || January 29, 2011 || Mount Lemmon || Mount Lemmon Survey || HOF || align=right | 2.3 km || 
|-id=066 bgcolor=#E9E9E9
| 427066 ||  || — || November 19, 2001 || Socorro || LINEAR || — || align=right | 1.7 km || 
|-id=067 bgcolor=#E9E9E9
| 427067 ||  || — || November 28, 2006 || Mount Lemmon || Mount Lemmon Survey ||  || align=right | 1.5 km || 
|-id=068 bgcolor=#d6d6d6
| 427068 ||  || — || September 28, 2009 || Mount Lemmon || Mount Lemmon Survey || — || align=right | 3.0 km || 
|-id=069 bgcolor=#d6d6d6
| 427069 ||  || — || January 17, 2005 || Kitt Peak || Spacewatch || — || align=right | 2.5 km || 
|-id=070 bgcolor=#E9E9E9
| 427070 ||  || — || October 1, 2005 || Kitt Peak || Spacewatch || — || align=right | 1.5 km || 
|-id=071 bgcolor=#fefefe
| 427071 ||  || — || September 13, 2007 || Kitt Peak || Spacewatch || — || align=right data-sort-value="0.68" | 680 m || 
|-id=072 bgcolor=#d6d6d6
| 427072 ||  || — || November 24, 2003 || Kitt Peak || Spacewatch || — || align=right | 3.5 km || 
|-id=073 bgcolor=#E9E9E9
| 427073 ||  || — || April 8, 2008 || Kitt Peak || Spacewatch || — || align=right | 1.2 km || 
|-id=074 bgcolor=#fefefe
| 427074 ||  || — || December 1, 2003 || Kitt Peak || Spacewatch || — || align=right data-sort-value="0.93" | 930 m || 
|-id=075 bgcolor=#E9E9E9
| 427075 ||  || — || November 3, 2005 || Catalina || CSS || — || align=right | 2.3 km || 
|-id=076 bgcolor=#d6d6d6
| 427076 ||  || — || September 24, 2008 || Kitt Peak || Spacewatch || — || align=right | 3.2 km || 
|-id=077 bgcolor=#d6d6d6
| 427077 ||  || — || October 8, 2008 || Catalina || CSS || — || align=right | 3.6 km || 
|-id=078 bgcolor=#E9E9E9
| 427078 ||  || — || April 11, 2003 || Kitt Peak || Spacewatch || — || align=right | 3.3 km || 
|-id=079 bgcolor=#E9E9E9
| 427079 ||  || — || December 6, 2010 || Mount Lemmon || Mount Lemmon Survey || — || align=right | 2.4 km || 
|-id=080 bgcolor=#d6d6d6
| 427080 ||  || — || November 20, 2009 || Kitt Peak || Spacewatch || — || align=right | 2.5 km || 
|-id=081 bgcolor=#d6d6d6
| 427081 ||  || — || January 31, 2006 || Kitt Peak || Spacewatch || — || align=right | 2.4 km || 
|-id=082 bgcolor=#E9E9E9
| 427082 ||  || — || November 2, 2005 || Mount Lemmon || Mount Lemmon Survey || — || align=right | 1.6 km || 
|-id=083 bgcolor=#E9E9E9
| 427083 ||  || — || September 30, 2005 || Mount Lemmon || Mount Lemmon Survey || — || align=right | 3.2 km || 
|-id=084 bgcolor=#E9E9E9
| 427084 ||  || — || November 27, 2006 || Mount Lemmon || Mount Lemmon Survey || — || align=right | 1.8 km || 
|-id=085 bgcolor=#E9E9E9
| 427085 ||  || — || November 3, 2005 || Kitt Peak || Spacewatch || — || align=right | 2.5 km || 
|-id=086 bgcolor=#E9E9E9
| 427086 ||  || — || September 27, 2000 || Kitt Peak || Spacewatch || GEF || align=right | 1.4 km || 
|-id=087 bgcolor=#d6d6d6
| 427087 ||  || — || November 19, 2003 || Kitt Peak || Spacewatch || — || align=right | 3.8 km || 
|-id=088 bgcolor=#E9E9E9
| 427088 ||  || — || September 29, 2005 || Anderson Mesa || LONEOS || — || align=right | 1.6 km || 
|-id=089 bgcolor=#E9E9E9
| 427089 ||  || — || October 14, 2010 || Mount Lemmon || Mount Lemmon Survey || (5) || align=right data-sort-value="0.85" | 850 m || 
|-id=090 bgcolor=#d6d6d6
| 427090 ||  || — || September 24, 2008 || Mount Lemmon || Mount Lemmon Survey || THM || align=right | 2.5 km || 
|-id=091 bgcolor=#d6d6d6
| 427091 ||  || — || October 18, 1992 || Kitt Peak || Spacewatch || — || align=right | 2.5 km || 
|-id=092 bgcolor=#E9E9E9
| 427092 ||  || — || August 22, 2004 || Kitt Peak || Spacewatch || — || align=right | 2.8 km || 
|-id=093 bgcolor=#fefefe
| 427093 ||  || — || September 17, 2003 || Kitt Peak || Spacewatch || NYS || align=right data-sort-value="0.61" | 610 m || 
|-id=094 bgcolor=#d6d6d6
| 427094 ||  || — || March 3, 2000 || Kitt Peak || Spacewatch || — || align=right | 3.1 km || 
|-id=095 bgcolor=#d6d6d6
| 427095 ||  || — || October 26, 2003 || Kitt Peak || Spacewatch || — || align=right | 3.6 km || 
|-id=096 bgcolor=#d6d6d6
| 427096 ||  || — || September 16, 2003 || Kitt Peak || Spacewatch || — || align=right | 2.6 km || 
|-id=097 bgcolor=#fefefe
| 427097 ||  || — || September 16, 2003 || Kitt Peak || Spacewatch || — || align=right data-sort-value="0.88" | 880 m || 
|-id=098 bgcolor=#fefefe
| 427098 ||  || — || November 19, 2003 || Kitt Peak || Spacewatch || NYS || align=right data-sort-value="0.61" | 610 m || 
|-id=099 bgcolor=#d6d6d6
| 427099 ||  || — || September 21, 2008 || Mount Lemmon || Mount Lemmon Survey || — || align=right | 2.1 km || 
|-id=100 bgcolor=#E9E9E9
| 427100 ||  || — || October 27, 1995 || Kitt Peak || Spacewatch || HOF || align=right | 2.6 km || 
|}

427101–427200 

|-bgcolor=#E9E9E9
| 427101 ||  || — || December 7, 2005 || Kitt Peak || Spacewatch || MRX || align=right | 1.1 km || 
|-id=102 bgcolor=#E9E9E9
| 427102 ||  || — || May 2, 2000 || Kitt Peak || Spacewatch || MAR || align=right | 1.0 km || 
|-id=103 bgcolor=#E9E9E9
| 427103 ||  || — || September 30, 2009 || Mount Lemmon || Mount Lemmon Survey || — || align=right | 2.2 km || 
|-id=104 bgcolor=#E9E9E9
| 427104 ||  || — || December 8, 2010 || Kitt Peak || Spacewatch || — || align=right | 1.8 km || 
|-id=105 bgcolor=#E9E9E9
| 427105 ||  || — || January 20, 2002 || Kitt Peak || Spacewatch || AST || align=right | 1.7 km || 
|-id=106 bgcolor=#E9E9E9
| 427106 ||  || — || May 13, 2008 || Mount Lemmon || Mount Lemmon Survey || — || align=right | 2.2 km || 
|-id=107 bgcolor=#d6d6d6
| 427107 ||  || — || October 19, 1999 || Kitt Peak || Spacewatch || — || align=right | 2.9 km || 
|-id=108 bgcolor=#fefefe
| 427108 ||  || — || February 25, 2012 || Catalina || CSS || — || align=right data-sort-value="0.75" | 750 m || 
|-id=109 bgcolor=#E9E9E9
| 427109 ||  || — || September 26, 2005 || Kitt Peak || Spacewatch || — || align=right | 1.9 km || 
|-id=110 bgcolor=#fefefe
| 427110 ||  || — || April 2, 2005 || Mount Lemmon || Mount Lemmon Survey || — || align=right data-sort-value="0.84" | 840 m || 
|-id=111 bgcolor=#d6d6d6
| 427111 ||  || — || December 10, 2009 || Mount Lemmon || Mount Lemmon Survey || — || align=right | 3.2 km || 
|-id=112 bgcolor=#d6d6d6
| 427112 ||  || — || March 18, 2007 || Kitt Peak || Spacewatch || EOS || align=right | 2.0 km || 
|-id=113 bgcolor=#E9E9E9
| 427113 ||  || — || March 23, 2004 || Kitt Peak || Spacewatch || — || align=right | 1.1 km || 
|-id=114 bgcolor=#E9E9E9
| 427114 ||  || — || December 27, 1997 || Kitt Peak || Spacewatch || — || align=right | 1.4 km || 
|-id=115 bgcolor=#fefefe
| 427115 ||  || — || August 19, 2010 || XuYi || PMO NEO || NYS || align=right data-sort-value="0.59" | 590 m || 
|-id=116 bgcolor=#fefefe
| 427116 ||  || — || September 20, 2001 || Socorro || LINEAR || — || align=right data-sort-value="0.65" | 650 m || 
|-id=117 bgcolor=#fefefe
| 427117 ||  || — || March 1, 2009 || Mount Lemmon || Mount Lemmon Survey || — || align=right data-sort-value="0.77" | 770 m || 
|-id=118 bgcolor=#d6d6d6
| 427118 ||  || — || March 5, 2006 || Mount Lemmon || Mount Lemmon Survey || — || align=right | 2.3 km || 
|-id=119 bgcolor=#d6d6d6
| 427119 ||  || — || October 19, 2003 || Kitt Peak || Spacewatch || THM || align=right | 1.8 km || 
|-id=120 bgcolor=#d6d6d6
| 427120 ||  || — || October 22, 2003 || Kitt Peak || Spacewatch || THM || align=right | 2.0 km || 
|-id=121 bgcolor=#d6d6d6
| 427121 ||  || — || October 22, 2009 || Mount Lemmon || Mount Lemmon Survey || — || align=right | 2.2 km || 
|-id=122 bgcolor=#d6d6d6
| 427122 ||  || — || January 4, 2011 || Mount Lemmon || Mount Lemmon Survey || — || align=right | 2.9 km || 
|-id=123 bgcolor=#E9E9E9
| 427123 ||  || — || September 24, 2005 || Kitt Peak || Spacewatch || — || align=right | 1.5 km || 
|-id=124 bgcolor=#d6d6d6
| 427124 ||  || — || November 19, 2003 || Kitt Peak || Spacewatch || THM || align=right | 2.8 km || 
|-id=125 bgcolor=#E9E9E9
| 427125 ||  || — || March 15, 2004 || Kitt Peak || Spacewatch || — || align=right | 1.1 km || 
|-id=126 bgcolor=#fefefe
| 427126 ||  || — || September 11, 2010 || Kitt Peak || Spacewatch || NYS || align=right data-sort-value="0.76" | 760 m || 
|-id=127 bgcolor=#E9E9E9
| 427127 ||  || — || December 14, 2001 || Socorro || LINEAR || — || align=right | 1.8 km || 
|-id=128 bgcolor=#E9E9E9
| 427128 ||  || — || October 27, 1995 || Kitt Peak || Spacewatch || AGN || align=right | 1.2 km || 
|-id=129 bgcolor=#fefefe
| 427129 ||  || — || January 31, 2009 || Mount Lemmon || Mount Lemmon Survey || — || align=right data-sort-value="0.56" | 560 m || 
|-id=130 bgcolor=#d6d6d6
| 427130 ||  || — || July 3, 2005 || Mount Lemmon || Mount Lemmon Survey || 3:2 || align=right | 3.8 km || 
|-id=131 bgcolor=#fefefe
| 427131 ||  || — || September 18, 2010 || Mount Lemmon || Mount Lemmon Survey || — || align=right data-sort-value="0.76" | 760 m || 
|-id=132 bgcolor=#fefefe
| 427132 ||  || — || December 6, 2007 || Mount Lemmon || Mount Lemmon Survey || — || align=right data-sort-value="0.73" | 730 m || 
|-id=133 bgcolor=#E9E9E9
| 427133 ||  || — || August 18, 2009 || Kitt Peak || Spacewatch || — || align=right | 1.5 km || 
|-id=134 bgcolor=#fefefe
| 427134 ||  || — || December 30, 2007 || Kitt Peak || Spacewatch || — || align=right data-sort-value="0.98" | 980 m || 
|-id=135 bgcolor=#E9E9E9
| 427135 ||  || — || January 8, 2011 || Mount Lemmon || Mount Lemmon Survey || — || align=right | 2.4 km || 
|-id=136 bgcolor=#d6d6d6
| 427136 ||  || — || October 2, 2003 || Kitt Peak || Spacewatch || EOS || align=right | 1.6 km || 
|-id=137 bgcolor=#d6d6d6
| 427137 ||  || — || September 22, 2008 || Mount Lemmon || Mount Lemmon Survey || — || align=right | 4.5 km || 
|-id=138 bgcolor=#fefefe
| 427138 ||  || — || March 28, 2009 || Kitt Peak || Spacewatch || — || align=right data-sort-value="0.89" | 890 m || 
|-id=139 bgcolor=#fefefe
| 427139 ||  || — || September 13, 2007 || Mount Lemmon || Mount Lemmon Survey || — || align=right data-sort-value="0.52" | 520 m || 
|-id=140 bgcolor=#fefefe
| 427140 ||  || — || December 30, 2007 || Kitt Peak || Spacewatch || — || align=right data-sort-value="0.77" | 770 m || 
|-id=141 bgcolor=#d6d6d6
| 427141 ||  || — || October 5, 2003 || Kitt Peak || Spacewatch || EOS || align=right | 2.0 km || 
|-id=142 bgcolor=#d6d6d6
| 427142 ||  || — || November 20, 2009 || Kitt Peak || Spacewatch || EOS || align=right | 1.6 km || 
|-id=143 bgcolor=#fefefe
| 427143 ||  || — || May 16, 2005 || Mount Lemmon || Mount Lemmon Survey || — || align=right data-sort-value="0.89" | 890 m || 
|-id=144 bgcolor=#d6d6d6
| 427144 ||  || — || October 7, 2004 || Kitt Peak || Spacewatch || — || align=right | 2.8 km || 
|-id=145 bgcolor=#fefefe
| 427145 ||  || — || September 24, 1995 || Kitt Peak || Spacewatch || MAS || align=right data-sort-value="0.51" | 510 m || 
|-id=146 bgcolor=#d6d6d6
| 427146 ||  || — || March 30, 2010 || WISE || WISE || — || align=right | 2.9 km || 
|-id=147 bgcolor=#fefefe
| 427147 ||  || — || January 30, 2006 || Kitt Peak || Spacewatch || — || align=right data-sort-value="0.57" | 570 m || 
|-id=148 bgcolor=#fefefe
| 427148 ||  || — || October 20, 2007 || Mount Lemmon || Mount Lemmon Survey || — || align=right data-sort-value="0.95" | 950 m || 
|-id=149 bgcolor=#d6d6d6
| 427149 ||  || — || April 22, 2007 || Kitt Peak || Spacewatch || — || align=right | 2.3 km || 
|-id=150 bgcolor=#d6d6d6
| 427150 ||  || — || October 29, 2003 || Kitt Peak || Spacewatch || — || align=right | 3.2 km || 
|-id=151 bgcolor=#fefefe
| 427151 ||  || — || October 22, 2003 || Anderson Mesa || LONEOS || H || align=right data-sort-value="0.82" | 820 m || 
|-id=152 bgcolor=#E9E9E9
| 427152 ||  || — || August 8, 2005 || Siding Spring || SSS || — || align=right | 2.1 km || 
|-id=153 bgcolor=#d6d6d6
| 427153 ||  || — || February 1, 1995 || Kitt Peak || Spacewatch || — || align=right | 3.5 km || 
|-id=154 bgcolor=#E9E9E9
| 427154 ||  || — || March 14, 2007 || Kitt Peak || Spacewatch || — || align=right | 2.1 km || 
|-id=155 bgcolor=#E9E9E9
| 427155 ||  || — || September 27, 2009 || Kitt Peak || Spacewatch || — || align=right | 2.2 km || 
|-id=156 bgcolor=#E9E9E9
| 427156 ||  || — || September 20, 2001 || Socorro || LINEAR || — || align=right | 1.8 km || 
|-id=157 bgcolor=#d6d6d6
| 427157 ||  || — || November 19, 2003 || Kitt Peak || Spacewatch || — || align=right | 3.3 km || 
|-id=158 bgcolor=#E9E9E9
| 427158 ||  || — || January 7, 2006 || Mount Lemmon || Mount Lemmon Survey || — || align=right | 2.7 km || 
|-id=159 bgcolor=#E9E9E9
| 427159 ||  || — || October 24, 2005 || Kitt Peak || Spacewatch || — || align=right | 2.9 km || 
|-id=160 bgcolor=#d6d6d6
| 427160 ||  || — || September 16, 2009 || Kitt Peak || Spacewatch || — || align=right | 2.1 km || 
|-id=161 bgcolor=#fefefe
| 427161 ||  || — || August 10, 2007 || Kitt Peak || Spacewatch || — || align=right data-sort-value="0.56" | 560 m || 
|-id=162 bgcolor=#E9E9E9
| 427162 ||  || — || September 30, 2005 || Mount Lemmon || Mount Lemmon Survey || — || align=right | 1.7 km || 
|-id=163 bgcolor=#fefefe
| 427163 ||  || — || January 25, 2009 || Kitt Peak || Spacewatch || — || align=right data-sort-value="0.75" | 750 m || 
|-id=164 bgcolor=#E9E9E9
| 427164 ||  || — || December 15, 2001 || Socorro || LINEAR || — || align=right | 1.9 km || 
|-id=165 bgcolor=#E9E9E9
| 427165 ||  || — || January 27, 2007 || Catalina || CSS || — || align=right | 2.3 km || 
|-id=166 bgcolor=#E9E9E9
| 427166 ||  || — || September 18, 2010 || Mount Lemmon || Mount Lemmon Survey || — || align=right data-sort-value="0.98" | 980 m || 
|-id=167 bgcolor=#fefefe
| 427167 ||  || — || July 8, 2010 || WISE || WISE || — || align=right | 1.9 km || 
|-id=168 bgcolor=#d6d6d6
| 427168 ||  || — || October 1, 2008 || Mount Lemmon || Mount Lemmon Survey || — || align=right | 2.6 km || 
|-id=169 bgcolor=#E9E9E9
| 427169 ||  || — || December 13, 2006 || Kitt Peak || Spacewatch || — || align=right data-sort-value="0.97" | 970 m || 
|-id=170 bgcolor=#E9E9E9
| 427170 ||  || — || March 26, 2009 || Kitt Peak || Spacewatch || — || align=right | 1.1 km || 
|-id=171 bgcolor=#d6d6d6
| 427171 ||  || — || October 9, 2008 || Mount Lemmon || Mount Lemmon Survey || — || align=right | 4.3 km || 
|-id=172 bgcolor=#d6d6d6
| 427172 ||  || — || September 22, 2008 || Catalina || CSS || — || align=right | 4.3 km || 
|-id=173 bgcolor=#d6d6d6
| 427173 ||  || — || December 26, 2009 || Kitt Peak || Spacewatch || — || align=right | 2.6 km || 
|-id=174 bgcolor=#d6d6d6
| 427174 ||  || — || November 19, 2003 || Kitt Peak || Spacewatch || — || align=right | 3.3 km || 
|-id=175 bgcolor=#E9E9E9
| 427175 ||  || — || May 27, 2008 || Kitt Peak || Spacewatch || GEF || align=right | 1.6 km || 
|-id=176 bgcolor=#d6d6d6
| 427176 ||  || — || December 1, 2003 || Socorro || LINEAR || — || align=right | 3.2 km || 
|-id=177 bgcolor=#d6d6d6
| 427177 ||  || — || March 21, 2010 || WISE || WISE || — || align=right | 4.1 km || 
|-id=178 bgcolor=#fefefe
| 427178 ||  || — || December 1, 2003 || Socorro || LINEAR || — || align=right data-sort-value="0.83" | 830 m || 
|-id=179 bgcolor=#E9E9E9
| 427179 ||  || — || November 1, 2006 || Mount Lemmon || Mount Lemmon Survey || (5) || align=right | 1.4 km || 
|-id=180 bgcolor=#d6d6d6
| 427180 ||  || — || January 31, 2006 || Kitt Peak || Spacewatch || — || align=right | 2.7 km || 
|-id=181 bgcolor=#fefefe
| 427181 ||  || — || February 11, 2002 || Socorro || LINEAR || H || align=right data-sort-value="0.64" | 640 m || 
|-id=182 bgcolor=#fefefe
| 427182 ||  || — || November 9, 1999 || Kitt Peak || Spacewatch || MAS || align=right data-sort-value="0.46" | 460 m || 
|-id=183 bgcolor=#fefefe
| 427183 ||  || — || September 27, 2003 || Kitt Peak || Spacewatch || MAS || align=right data-sort-value="0.58" | 580 m || 
|-id=184 bgcolor=#d6d6d6
| 427184 ||  || — || April 25, 2007 || Mount Lemmon || Mount Lemmon Survey || — || align=right | 3.2 km || 
|-id=185 bgcolor=#E9E9E9
| 427185 ||  || — || January 17, 2007 || Kitt Peak || Spacewatch || — || align=right | 1.4 km || 
|-id=186 bgcolor=#E9E9E9
| 427186 ||  || — || August 16, 2009 || Catalina || CSS || DOR || align=right | 2.4 km || 
|-id=187 bgcolor=#E9E9E9
| 427187 ||  || — || May 19, 2005 || Mount Lemmon || Mount Lemmon Survey || — || align=right | 1.0 km || 
|-id=188 bgcolor=#d6d6d6
| 427188 ||  || — || September 18, 1998 || Caussols || ODAS || — || align=right | 3.1 km || 
|-id=189 bgcolor=#d6d6d6
| 427189 ||  || — || October 18, 2003 || Anderson Mesa || LONEOS || — || align=right | 2.7 km || 
|-id=190 bgcolor=#d6d6d6
| 427190 ||  || — || November 21, 2003 || Socorro || LINEAR || Tj (2.96) || align=right | 3.2 km || 
|-id=191 bgcolor=#d6d6d6
| 427191 ||  || — || January 16, 2005 || Kitt Peak || Spacewatch || — || align=right | 2.3 km || 
|-id=192 bgcolor=#fefefe
| 427192 ||  || — || September 12, 2007 || Catalina || CSS || — || align=right data-sort-value="0.72" | 720 m || 
|-id=193 bgcolor=#fefefe
| 427193 ||  || — || September 28, 2003 || Anderson Mesa || LONEOS || V || align=right data-sort-value="0.74" | 740 m || 
|-id=194 bgcolor=#d6d6d6
| 427194 ||  || — || December 10, 2004 || Kitt Peak || Spacewatch || — || align=right | 3.1 km || 
|-id=195 bgcolor=#E9E9E9
| 427195 ||  || — || May 9, 1996 || Kitt Peak || Spacewatch || RAF || align=right | 1.1 km || 
|-id=196 bgcolor=#E9E9E9
| 427196 ||  || — || September 29, 2005 || Kitt Peak || Spacewatch || — || align=right | 1.0 km || 
|-id=197 bgcolor=#E9E9E9
| 427197 ||  || — || October 29, 2005 || Mount Lemmon || Mount Lemmon Survey || — || align=right | 1.9 km || 
|-id=198 bgcolor=#E9E9E9
| 427198 ||  || — || December 6, 2010 || Kitt Peak || Spacewatch || — || align=right | 1.1 km || 
|-id=199 bgcolor=#E9E9E9
| 427199 ||  || — || November 21, 1997 || Kitt Peak || Spacewatch || — || align=right | 1.7 km || 
|-id=200 bgcolor=#E9E9E9
| 427200 ||  || — || October 31, 2005 || Mount Lemmon || Mount Lemmon Survey || — || align=right | 2.2 km || 
|}

427201–427300 

|-bgcolor=#fefefe
| 427201 ||  || — || October 21, 2003 || Kitt Peak || Spacewatch || MAS || align=right data-sort-value="0.61" | 610 m || 
|-id=202 bgcolor=#d6d6d6
| 427202 ||  || — || November 20, 2001 || Socorro || LINEAR || 7:4 || align=right | 3.7 km || 
|-id=203 bgcolor=#d6d6d6
| 427203 ||  || — || November 24, 2003 || Kitt Peak || Spacewatch || — || align=right | 3.6 km || 
|-id=204 bgcolor=#E9E9E9
| 427204 ||  || — || September 30, 2005 || Mount Lemmon || Mount Lemmon Survey || — || align=right | 2.9 km || 
|-id=205 bgcolor=#fefefe
| 427205 ||  || — || December 28, 2005 || Kitt Peak || Spacewatch || — || align=right data-sort-value="0.51" | 510 m || 
|-id=206 bgcolor=#d6d6d6
| 427206 ||  || — || October 23, 2003 || Anderson Mesa || LONEOS || — || align=right | 4.3 km || 
|-id=207 bgcolor=#d6d6d6
| 427207 ||  || — || February 26, 2011 || Mount Lemmon || Mount Lemmon Survey || — || align=right | 3.3 km || 
|-id=208 bgcolor=#fefefe
| 427208 ||  || — || May 4, 2009 || Mount Lemmon || Mount Lemmon Survey || MAS || align=right data-sort-value="0.87" | 870 m || 
|-id=209 bgcolor=#fefefe
| 427209 ||  || — || October 20, 2003 || Kitt Peak || Spacewatch || — || align=right data-sort-value="0.76" | 760 m || 
|-id=210 bgcolor=#d6d6d6
| 427210 ||  || — || January 29, 1995 || Kitt Peak || Spacewatch || — || align=right | 3.1 km || 
|-id=211 bgcolor=#E9E9E9
| 427211 ||  || — || October 31, 2010 || Kitt Peak || Spacewatch || EUN || align=right data-sort-value="0.90" | 900 m || 
|-id=212 bgcolor=#fefefe
| 427212 ||  || — || March 23, 2006 || Kitt Peak || Spacewatch || — || align=right data-sort-value="0.77" | 770 m || 
|-id=213 bgcolor=#d6d6d6
| 427213 ||  || — || October 24, 2009 || Kitt Peak || Spacewatch || KOR || align=right | 1.3 km || 
|-id=214 bgcolor=#d6d6d6
| 427214 ||  || — || September 21, 2009 || Mount Lemmon || Mount Lemmon Survey || — || align=right | 2.0 km || 
|-id=215 bgcolor=#E9E9E9
| 427215 ||  || — || October 6, 2005 || Mount Lemmon || Mount Lemmon Survey || — || align=right | 2.1 km || 
|-id=216 bgcolor=#fefefe
| 427216 ||  || — || December 13, 2004 || Kitt Peak || Spacewatch || V || align=right data-sort-value="0.54" | 540 m || 
|-id=217 bgcolor=#d6d6d6
| 427217 ||  || — || March 4, 1997 || Kitt Peak || Spacewatch || KOR || align=right | 1.5 km || 
|-id=218 bgcolor=#E9E9E9
| 427218 ||  || — || September 14, 2005 || Kitt Peak || Spacewatch || — || align=right | 1.1 km || 
|-id=219 bgcolor=#fefefe
| 427219 ||  || — || October 30, 2007 || Kitt Peak || Spacewatch || — || align=right data-sort-value="0.85" | 850 m || 
|-id=220 bgcolor=#E9E9E9
| 427220 ||  || — || September 28, 2000 || Kitt Peak || Spacewatch || — || align=right | 2.2 km || 
|-id=221 bgcolor=#d6d6d6
| 427221 ||  || — || October 1, 2003 || Anderson Mesa || LONEOS || EOS || align=right | 2.4 km || 
|-id=222 bgcolor=#E9E9E9
| 427222 ||  || — || October 7, 2004 || Kitt Peak || Spacewatch || — || align=right | 2.5 km || 
|-id=223 bgcolor=#E9E9E9
| 427223 ||  || — || November 17, 2006 || Kitt Peak || Spacewatch || — || align=right | 1.1 km || 
|-id=224 bgcolor=#fefefe
| 427224 ||  || — || November 18, 2003 || Kitt Peak || Spacewatch || NYS || align=right data-sort-value="0.51" | 510 m || 
|-id=225 bgcolor=#E9E9E9
| 427225 ||  || — || September 23, 2000 || Anderson Mesa || LONEOS || — || align=right | 2.5 km || 
|-id=226 bgcolor=#E9E9E9
| 427226 ||  || — || October 22, 2005 || Kitt Peak || Spacewatch || NEM || align=right | 2.7 km || 
|-id=227 bgcolor=#E9E9E9
| 427227 ||  || — || May 26, 2007 || Mount Lemmon || Mount Lemmon Survey || DOR || align=right | 2.5 km || 
|-id=228 bgcolor=#d6d6d6
| 427228 ||  || — || November 10, 2009 || Kitt Peak || Spacewatch || — || align=right | 3.2 km || 
|-id=229 bgcolor=#E9E9E9
| 427229 ||  || — || October 23, 2006 || Mount Lemmon || Mount Lemmon Survey || — || align=right data-sort-value="0.87" | 870 m || 
|-id=230 bgcolor=#C2FFFF
| 427230 ||  || — || April 29, 2008 || Mount Lemmon || Mount Lemmon Survey || L5 || align=right | 11 km || 
|-id=231 bgcolor=#d6d6d6
| 427231 ||  || — || November 20, 2009 || Kitt Peak || Spacewatch || — || align=right | 3.7 km || 
|-id=232 bgcolor=#E9E9E9
| 427232 ||  || — || December 1, 2005 || Kitt Peak || Spacewatch || AEO || align=right | 1.3 km || 
|-id=233 bgcolor=#fefefe
| 427233 ||  || — || October 19, 2003 || Kitt Peak || Spacewatch || MAS || align=right data-sort-value="0.56" | 560 m || 
|-id=234 bgcolor=#fefefe
| 427234 ||  || — || December 5, 1999 || Kitt Peak || Spacewatch || — || align=right data-sort-value="0.83" | 830 m || 
|-id=235 bgcolor=#E9E9E9
| 427235 ||  || — || November 25, 2006 || Mount Lemmon || Mount Lemmon Survey || — || align=right data-sort-value="0.96" | 960 m || 
|-id=236 bgcolor=#E9E9E9
| 427236 ||  || — || February 25, 2007 || Mount Lemmon || Mount Lemmon Survey || — || align=right | 1.6 km || 
|-id=237 bgcolor=#E9E9E9
| 427237 ||  || — || February 8, 2002 || Kitt Peak || Spacewatch || HOF || align=right | 2.9 km || 
|-id=238 bgcolor=#E9E9E9
| 427238 ||  || — || October 29, 2005 || Mount Lemmon || Mount Lemmon Survey || GEF || align=right | 1.3 km || 
|-id=239 bgcolor=#E9E9E9
| 427239 ||  || — || December 2, 2010 || Kitt Peak || Spacewatch || — || align=right | 1.6 km || 
|-id=240 bgcolor=#E9E9E9
| 427240 ||  || — || November 30, 2005 || Kitt Peak || Spacewatch || DOR || align=right | 2.8 km || 
|-id=241 bgcolor=#fefefe
| 427241 ||  || — || December 29, 2003 || Kitt Peak || Spacewatch || — || align=right data-sort-value="0.98" | 980 m || 
|-id=242 bgcolor=#E9E9E9
| 427242 ||  || — || October 24, 2005 || Kitt Peak || Spacewatch || — || align=right | 2.0 km || 
|-id=243 bgcolor=#E9E9E9
| 427243 ||  || — || October 7, 2005 || Mount Lemmon || Mount Lemmon Survey || — || align=right | 1.2 km || 
|-id=244 bgcolor=#d6d6d6
| 427244 ||  || — || May 25, 2006 || Mount Lemmon || Mount Lemmon Survey || — || align=right | 4.8 km || 
|-id=245 bgcolor=#d6d6d6
| 427245 ||  || — || November 19, 2003 || Kitt Peak || Spacewatch || — || align=right | 4.0 km || 
|-id=246 bgcolor=#d6d6d6
| 427246 ||  || — || January 6, 2010 || Kitt Peak || Spacewatch || THM || align=right | 2.2 km || 
|-id=247 bgcolor=#d6d6d6
| 427247 ||  || — || August 9, 2007 || Socorro || LINEAR || Tj (2.98) || align=right | 4.3 km || 
|-id=248 bgcolor=#E9E9E9
| 427248 ||  || — || April 6, 2008 || Kitt Peak || Spacewatch || — || align=right | 1.4 km || 
|-id=249 bgcolor=#E9E9E9
| 427249 ||  || — || November 9, 2001 || Socorro || LINEAR || — || align=right | 1.5 km || 
|-id=250 bgcolor=#fefefe
| 427250 ||  || — || December 18, 2003 || Kitt Peak || Spacewatch || NYScritical || align=right data-sort-value="0.55" | 550 m || 
|-id=251 bgcolor=#E9E9E9
| 427251 ||  || — || August 22, 2004 || Kitt Peak || Spacewatch || HOF || align=right | 2.3 km || 
|-id=252 bgcolor=#fefefe
| 427252 ||  || — || March 8, 2005 || Mount Lemmon || Mount Lemmon Survey || — || align=right data-sort-value="0.80" | 800 m || 
|-id=253 bgcolor=#fefefe
| 427253 ||  || — || November 1, 1999 || Kitt Peak || Spacewatch || — || align=right data-sort-value="0.72" | 720 m || 
|-id=254 bgcolor=#d6d6d6
| 427254 ||  || — || February 1, 2006 || Kitt Peak || Spacewatch || — || align=right | 3.3 km || 
|-id=255 bgcolor=#d6d6d6
| 427255 ||  || — || April 29, 2006 || Kitt Peak || Spacewatch || — || align=right | 5.0 km || 
|-id=256 bgcolor=#E9E9E9
| 427256 ||  || — || September 25, 2009 || Catalina || CSS || — || align=right | 2.5 km || 
|-id=257 bgcolor=#d6d6d6
| 427257 ||  || — || May 10, 2005 || Kitt Peak || Spacewatch || — || align=right | 3.1 km || 
|-id=258 bgcolor=#fefefe
| 427258 ||  || — || November 27, 2011 || Mount Lemmon || Mount Lemmon Survey || — || align=right data-sort-value="0.84" | 840 m || 
|-id=259 bgcolor=#E9E9E9
| 427259 ||  || — || April 27, 2008 || Mount Lemmon || Mount Lemmon Survey || — || align=right | 2.3 km || 
|-id=260 bgcolor=#E9E9E9
| 427260 ||  || — || December 6, 1996 || Kitt Peak || Spacewatch || — || align=right | 2.6 km || 
|-id=261 bgcolor=#d6d6d6
| 427261 ||  || — || November 16, 1998 || Kitt Peak || Spacewatch || — || align=right | 2.5 km || 
|-id=262 bgcolor=#E9E9E9
| 427262 ||  || — || November 3, 2005 || Kitt Peak || Spacewatch || — || align=right | 2.4 km || 
|-id=263 bgcolor=#fefefe
| 427263 ||  || — || March 21, 2009 || Kitt Peak || Spacewatch || — || align=right | 1.0 km || 
|-id=264 bgcolor=#fefefe
| 427264 ||  || — || September 19, 2006 || Catalina || CSS || — || align=right data-sort-value="0.88" | 880 m || 
|-id=265 bgcolor=#E9E9E9
| 427265 ||  || — || November 21, 2005 || Kitt Peak || Spacewatch || — || align=right | 2.2 km || 
|-id=266 bgcolor=#fefefe
| 427266 ||  || — || September 25, 1998 || Kitt Peak || Spacewatch || — || align=right | 1.2 km || 
|-id=267 bgcolor=#d6d6d6
| 427267 ||  || — || December 29, 2003 || Socorro || LINEAR || — || align=right | 3.1 km || 
|-id=268 bgcolor=#fefefe
| 427268 ||  || — || January 13, 2008 || Kitt Peak || Spacewatch || — || align=right data-sort-value="0.82" | 820 m || 
|-id=269 bgcolor=#E9E9E9
| 427269 ||  || — || November 25, 1997 || Kitt Peak || Spacewatch || — || align=right | 1.7 km || 
|-id=270 bgcolor=#fefefe
| 427270 ||  || — || January 4, 2012 || Mount Lemmon || Mount Lemmon Survey || — || align=right data-sort-value="0.76" | 760 m || 
|-id=271 bgcolor=#fefefe
| 427271 ||  || — || January 8, 2002 || Socorro || LINEAR || — || align=right data-sort-value="0.65" | 650 m || 
|-id=272 bgcolor=#E9E9E9
| 427272 ||  || — || November 16, 2006 || Mount Lemmon || Mount Lemmon Survey || — || align=right | 1.7 km || 
|-id=273 bgcolor=#fefefe
| 427273 ||  || — || December 22, 2003 || Kitt Peak || Spacewatch || — || align=right data-sort-value="0.68" | 680 m || 
|-id=274 bgcolor=#d6d6d6
| 427274 ||  || — || December 16, 2004 || Kitt Peak || Spacewatch || — || align=right | 3.3 km || 
|-id=275 bgcolor=#E9E9E9
| 427275 ||  || — || December 7, 2005 || Kitt Peak || Spacewatch || AGN || align=right | 1.8 km || 
|-id=276 bgcolor=#d6d6d6
| 427276 ||  || — || April 2, 2005 || Mount Lemmon || Mount Lemmon Survey || — || align=right | 2.9 km || 
|-id=277 bgcolor=#fefefe
| 427277 ||  || — || September 18, 2003 || Kitt Peak || Spacewatch || — || align=right data-sort-value="0.81" | 810 m || 
|-id=278 bgcolor=#d6d6d6
| 427278 ||  || — || January 15, 2010 || Catalina || CSS || — || align=right | 4.5 km || 
|-id=279 bgcolor=#fefefe
| 427279 ||  || — || February 29, 2008 || Kitt Peak || Spacewatch || — || align=right | 1.1 km || 
|-id=280 bgcolor=#E9E9E9
| 427280 ||  || — || May 13, 1996 || Kitt Peak || Spacewatch || — || align=right | 1.8 km || 
|-id=281 bgcolor=#fefefe
| 427281 ||  || — || March 11, 2008 || Mount Lemmon || Mount Lemmon Survey || — || align=right data-sort-value="0.80" | 800 m || 
|-id=282 bgcolor=#fefefe
| 427282 ||  || — || November 2, 2007 || Catalina || CSS || — || align=right | 1.1 km || 
|-id=283 bgcolor=#d6d6d6
| 427283 ||  || — || December 1, 2003 || Socorro || LINEAR || — || align=right | 5.2 km || 
|-id=284 bgcolor=#d6d6d6
| 427284 ||  || — || December 28, 2005 || Kitt Peak || Spacewatch || — || align=right | 3.3 km || 
|-id=285 bgcolor=#d6d6d6
| 427285 ||  || — || October 21, 2008 || Mount Lemmon || Mount Lemmon Survey || — || align=right | 2.9 km || 
|-id=286 bgcolor=#fefefe
| 427286 ||  || — || September 11, 2010 || Catalina || CSS || V || align=right data-sort-value="0.56" | 560 m || 
|-id=287 bgcolor=#d6d6d6
| 427287 ||  || — || October 10, 2008 || Mount Lemmon || Mount Lemmon Survey || — || align=right | 3.1 km || 
|-id=288 bgcolor=#d6d6d6
| 427288 ||  || — || August 28, 1995 || Kitt Peak || Spacewatch || — || align=right | 4.5 km || 
|-id=289 bgcolor=#d6d6d6
| 427289 ||  || — || December 17, 2009 || Mount Lemmon || Mount Lemmon Survey || — || align=right | 3.0 km || 
|-id=290 bgcolor=#fefefe
| 427290 ||  || — || December 24, 2011 || Mount Lemmon || Mount Lemmon Survey || — || align=right data-sort-value="0.74" | 740 m || 
|-id=291 bgcolor=#d6d6d6
| 427291 ||  || — || April 9, 2010 || WISE || WISE || — || align=right | 3.6 km || 
|-id=292 bgcolor=#d6d6d6
| 427292 ||  || — || June 9, 2007 || Kitt Peak || Spacewatch || — || align=right | 3.9 km || 
|-id=293 bgcolor=#fefefe
| 427293 ||  || — || October 8, 2007 || Catalina || CSS || V || align=right data-sort-value="0.65" | 650 m || 
|-id=294 bgcolor=#E9E9E9
| 427294 ||  || — || November 15, 2006 || Mount Lemmon || Mount Lemmon Survey || — || align=right data-sort-value="0.68" | 680 m || 
|-id=295 bgcolor=#d6d6d6
| 427295 ||  || — || April 25, 2007 || Kitt Peak || Spacewatch || — || align=right | 3.4 km || 
|-id=296 bgcolor=#d6d6d6
| 427296 ||  || — || December 20, 2004 || Mount Lemmon || Mount Lemmon Survey || VER || align=right | 4.2 km || 
|-id=297 bgcolor=#E9E9E9
| 427297 ||  || — || April 11, 2008 || Mount Lemmon || Mount Lemmon Survey || — || align=right | 3.0 km || 
|-id=298 bgcolor=#d6d6d6
| 427298 ||  || — || December 10, 2004 || Kitt Peak || Spacewatch || — || align=right | 3.1 km || 
|-id=299 bgcolor=#E9E9E9
| 427299 ||  || — || September 29, 2009 || Mount Lemmon || Mount Lemmon Survey || — || align=right | 2.2 km || 
|-id=300 bgcolor=#fefefe
| 427300 ||  || — || January 16, 2005 || Kitt Peak || Spacewatch || — || align=right data-sort-value="0.64" | 640 m || 
|}

427301–427400 

|-bgcolor=#E9E9E9
| 427301 ||  || — || November 17, 2006 || Mount Lemmon || Mount Lemmon Survey || — || align=right data-sort-value="0.78" | 780 m || 
|-id=302 bgcolor=#fefefe
| 427302 ||  || — || November 10, 2004 || Kitt Peak || Spacewatch || — || align=right data-sort-value="0.85" | 850 m || 
|-id=303 bgcolor=#d6d6d6
| 427303 ||  || — || December 28, 2003 || Kitt Peak || Spacewatch || — || align=right | 3.9 km || 
|-id=304 bgcolor=#E9E9E9
| 427304 ||  || — || September 16, 2009 || Catalina || CSS || — || align=right | 3.1 km || 
|-id=305 bgcolor=#fefefe
| 427305 ||  || — || June 1, 2005 || Kitt Peak || Spacewatch || — || align=right data-sort-value="0.92" | 920 m || 
|-id=306 bgcolor=#fefefe
| 427306 ||  || — || October 1, 2010 || Kitt Peak || Spacewatch || — || align=right data-sort-value="0.73" | 730 m || 
|-id=307 bgcolor=#E9E9E9
| 427307 ||  || — || March 20, 2007 || Kitt Peak || Spacewatch || — || align=right | 2.5 km || 
|-id=308 bgcolor=#d6d6d6
| 427308 ||  || — || February 21, 2006 || Kitt Peak || Spacewatch || — || align=right | 2.9 km || 
|-id=309 bgcolor=#E9E9E9
| 427309 ||  || — || February 7, 2008 || Mount Lemmon || Mount Lemmon Survey || — || align=right | 1.4 km || 
|-id=310 bgcolor=#d6d6d6
| 427310 ||  || — || February 15, 2010 || Catalina || CSS || — || align=right | 3.0 km || 
|-id=311 bgcolor=#d6d6d6
| 427311 ||  || — || November 20, 2009 || Mount Lemmon || Mount Lemmon Survey || — || align=right | 2.5 km || 
|-id=312 bgcolor=#fefefe
| 427312 ||  || — || March 11, 1996 || Kitt Peak || Spacewatch || — || align=right data-sort-value="0.80" | 800 m || 
|-id=313 bgcolor=#E9E9E9
| 427313 ||  || — || April 21, 2003 || Kitt Peak || Spacewatch || — || align=right | 2.2 km || 
|-id=314 bgcolor=#fefefe
| 427314 ||  || — || September 9, 2007 || Anderson Mesa || LONEOS || — || align=right data-sort-value="0.67" | 670 m || 
|-id=315 bgcolor=#E9E9E9
| 427315 ||  || — || April 30, 2004 || Kitt Peak || Spacewatch || — || align=right | 2.0 km || 
|-id=316 bgcolor=#fefefe
| 427316 ||  || — || February 29, 2004 || Kitt Peak || Spacewatch || — || align=right | 1.0 km || 
|-id=317 bgcolor=#d6d6d6
| 427317 ||  || — || May 14, 2012 || Mount Lemmon || Mount Lemmon Survey || — || align=right | 3.8 km || 
|-id=318 bgcolor=#d6d6d6
| 427318 ||  || — || March 4, 2011 || Mount Lemmon || Mount Lemmon Survey || — || align=right | 2.4 km || 
|-id=319 bgcolor=#d6d6d6
| 427319 ||  || — || July 30, 2008 || Mount Lemmon || Mount Lemmon Survey || EOS || align=right | 1.6 km || 
|-id=320 bgcolor=#E9E9E9
| 427320 ||  || — || February 16, 2007 || Catalina || CSS || — || align=right | 2.2 km || 
|-id=321 bgcolor=#d6d6d6
| 427321 ||  || — || April 25, 2007 || Mount Lemmon || Mount Lemmon Survey || BRA || align=right | 1.5 km || 
|-id=322 bgcolor=#E9E9E9
| 427322 ||  || — || December 31, 2002 || Socorro || LINEAR || MAR || align=right | 1.5 km || 
|-id=323 bgcolor=#E9E9E9
| 427323 ||  || — || January 5, 2006 || Kitt Peak || Spacewatch || — || align=right | 2.2 km || 
|-id=324 bgcolor=#E9E9E9
| 427324 ||  || — || December 23, 2006 || Mount Lemmon || Mount Lemmon Survey || — || align=right | 1.4 km || 
|-id=325 bgcolor=#d6d6d6
| 427325 ||  || — || March 5, 2011 || Catalina || CSS || — || align=right | 3.4 km || 
|-id=326 bgcolor=#E9E9E9
| 427326 ||  || — || September 27, 2005 || Kitt Peak || Spacewatch || — || align=right | 1.4 km || 
|-id=327 bgcolor=#fefefe
| 427327 ||  || — || September 10, 2007 || Kitt Peak || Spacewatch || — || align=right data-sort-value="0.82" | 820 m || 
|-id=328 bgcolor=#E9E9E9
| 427328 ||  || — || November 4, 2005 || Mount Lemmon || Mount Lemmon Survey || — || align=right | 2.4 km || 
|-id=329 bgcolor=#d6d6d6
| 427329 ||  || — || June 8, 2005 || Kitt Peak || Spacewatch || 3:2 || align=right | 4.7 km || 
|-id=330 bgcolor=#E9E9E9
| 427330 ||  || — || November 16, 2006 || Kitt Peak || Spacewatch || MAR || align=right | 1.1 km || 
|-id=331 bgcolor=#d6d6d6
| 427331 ||  || — || March 6, 2010 || WISE || WISE || — || align=right | 3.7 km || 
|-id=332 bgcolor=#d6d6d6
| 427332 ||  || — || August 7, 2008 || Kitt Peak || Spacewatch || — || align=right | 2.4 km || 
|-id=333 bgcolor=#d6d6d6
| 427333 ||  || — || September 19, 2008 || Kitt Peak || Spacewatch || EOS || align=right | 1.5 km || 
|-id=334 bgcolor=#d6d6d6
| 427334 ||  || — || February 2, 2006 || Kitt Peak || Spacewatch || NAE || align=right | 3.2 km || 
|-id=335 bgcolor=#d6d6d6
| 427335 ||  || — || December 17, 2009 || Kitt Peak || Spacewatch || EOS || align=right | 2.0 km || 
|-id=336 bgcolor=#d6d6d6
| 427336 ||  || — || March 5, 2006 || Kitt Peak || Spacewatch || — || align=right | 3.2 km || 
|-id=337 bgcolor=#E9E9E9
| 427337 ||  || — || November 27, 2005 || Anderson Mesa || LONEOS || — || align=right | 2.0 km || 
|-id=338 bgcolor=#d6d6d6
| 427338 ||  || — || February 1, 2006 || Kitt Peak || Spacewatch || — || align=right | 3.0 km || 
|-id=339 bgcolor=#d6d6d6
| 427339 ||  || — || July 30, 2008 || Kitt Peak || Spacewatch || — || align=right | 3.2 km || 
|-id=340 bgcolor=#fefefe
| 427340 ||  || — || November 17, 2007 || Mount Lemmon || Mount Lemmon Survey || — || align=right data-sort-value="0.91" | 910 m || 
|-id=341 bgcolor=#d6d6d6
| 427341 ||  || — || September 21, 2003 || Kitt Peak || Spacewatch || — || align=right | 3.4 km || 
|-id=342 bgcolor=#E9E9E9
| 427342 ||  || — || September 29, 2005 || Kitt Peak || Spacewatch || — || align=right | 1.9 km || 
|-id=343 bgcolor=#E9E9E9
| 427343 ||  || — || November 17, 2006 || Mount Lemmon || Mount Lemmon Survey || — || align=right | 1.3 km || 
|-id=344 bgcolor=#E9E9E9
| 427344 ||  || — || February 21, 2007 || Mount Lemmon || Mount Lemmon Survey || — || align=right | 1.5 km || 
|-id=345 bgcolor=#d6d6d6
| 427345 ||  || — || October 8, 1993 || Kitt Peak || Spacewatch || EOS || align=right | 2.0 km || 
|-id=346 bgcolor=#C2FFFF
| 427346 ||  || — || March 17, 2007 || Catalina || CSS || L5 || align=right | 15 km || 
|-id=347 bgcolor=#fefefe
| 427347 ||  || — || September 21, 2003 || Kitt Peak || Spacewatch || — || align=right data-sort-value="0.72" | 720 m || 
|-id=348 bgcolor=#d6d6d6
| 427348 ||  || — || March 12, 2005 || Kitt Peak || Spacewatch || ELF || align=right | 3.6 km || 
|-id=349 bgcolor=#E9E9E9
| 427349 ||  || — || September 19, 2001 || Socorro || LINEAR || — || align=right | 1.5 km || 
|-id=350 bgcolor=#d6d6d6
| 427350 ||  || — || March 31, 2010 || WISE || WISE || — || align=right | 2.9 km || 
|-id=351 bgcolor=#d6d6d6
| 427351 ||  || — || October 21, 2003 || Kitt Peak || Spacewatch || — || align=right | 2.3 km || 
|-id=352 bgcolor=#d6d6d6
| 427352 ||  || — || December 18, 2003 || Kitt Peak || Spacewatch || — || align=right | 3.6 km || 
|-id=353 bgcolor=#d6d6d6
| 427353 ||  || — || March 11, 2010 || WISE || WISE || — || align=right | 4.6 km || 
|-id=354 bgcolor=#d6d6d6
| 427354 ||  || — || November 30, 1999 || Kitt Peak || Spacewatch || KOR || align=right | 1.5 km || 
|-id=355 bgcolor=#d6d6d6
| 427355 ||  || — || December 1, 2003 || Kitt Peak || Spacewatch || — || align=right | 2.4 km || 
|-id=356 bgcolor=#d6d6d6
| 427356 ||  || — || March 29, 2010 || WISE || WISE || — || align=right | 3.4 km || 
|-id=357 bgcolor=#E9E9E9
| 427357 ||  || — || December 6, 2005 || Kitt Peak || Spacewatch || — || align=right | 3.0 km || 
|-id=358 bgcolor=#fefefe
| 427358 ||  || — || June 14, 2010 || Mount Lemmon || Mount Lemmon Survey || — || align=right data-sort-value="0.89" | 890 m || 
|-id=359 bgcolor=#d6d6d6
| 427359 ||  || — || April 1, 2005 || Catalina || CSS || — || align=right | 5.2 km || 
|-id=360 bgcolor=#d6d6d6
| 427360 ||  || — || January 8, 2010 || Kitt Peak || Spacewatch || EOS || align=right | 1.7 km || 
|-id=361 bgcolor=#fefefe
| 427361 ||  || — || June 4, 2005 || Kitt Peak || Spacewatch || — || align=right | 1.1 km || 
|-id=362 bgcolor=#fefefe
| 427362 ||  || — || August 29, 2006 || Catalina || CSS || — || align=right | 1.0 km || 
|-id=363 bgcolor=#E9E9E9
| 427363 ||  || — || November 10, 2010 || Mount Lemmon || Mount Lemmon Survey || — || align=right | 2.0 km || 
|-id=364 bgcolor=#E9E9E9
| 427364 ||  || — || December 28, 2005 || Kitt Peak || Spacewatch || DOR || align=right | 3.3 km || 
|-id=365 bgcolor=#d6d6d6
| 427365 ||  || — || October 24, 2003 || Kitt Peak || Spacewatch || EOS || align=right | 1.9 km || 
|-id=366 bgcolor=#d6d6d6
| 427366 ||  || — || September 19, 2001 || Socorro || LINEAR || — || align=right | 3.5 km || 
|-id=367 bgcolor=#E9E9E9
| 427367 ||  || — || November 10, 2001 || Socorro || LINEAR || ADE || align=right | 1.9 km || 
|-id=368 bgcolor=#fefefe
| 427368 ||  || — || December 18, 2003 || Socorro || LINEAR || — || align=right | 1.1 km || 
|-id=369 bgcolor=#C2FFFF
| 427369 ||  || — || June 1, 1997 || Kitt Peak || Spacewatch || L5 || align=right | 11 km || 
|-id=370 bgcolor=#d6d6d6
| 427370 ||  || — || December 16, 2003 || Kitt Peak || Spacewatch || — || align=right | 5.2 km || 
|-id=371 bgcolor=#E9E9E9
| 427371 ||  || — || January 4, 2003 || Socorro || LINEAR || — || align=right | 1.3 km || 
|-id=372 bgcolor=#fefefe
| 427372 ||  || — || October 2, 2003 || Kitt Peak || Spacewatch || NYS || align=right data-sort-value="0.61" | 610 m || 
|-id=373 bgcolor=#E9E9E9
| 427373 ||  || — || December 19, 2001 || Socorro || LINEAR || — || align=right | 1.9 km || 
|-id=374 bgcolor=#C2FFFF
| 427374 ||  || — || January 18, 2005 || Kitt Peak || Spacewatch || L5 || align=right | 9.8 km || 
|-id=375 bgcolor=#fefefe
| 427375 ||  || — || October 23, 2006 || Kitt Peak || Spacewatch || H || align=right data-sort-value="0.61" | 610 m || 
|-id=376 bgcolor=#E9E9E9
| 427376 ||  || — || August 28, 2005 || Kitt Peak || Spacewatch || — || align=right | 1.3 km || 
|-id=377 bgcolor=#E9E9E9
| 427377 ||  || — || November 17, 2006 || Kitt Peak || Spacewatch || — || align=right | 1.2 km || 
|-id=378 bgcolor=#E9E9E9
| 427378 ||  || — || November 20, 2001 || Socorro || LINEAR || — || align=right | 2.1 km || 
|-id=379 bgcolor=#E9E9E9
| 427379 ||  || — || September 9, 1977 || Palomar || PLS || — || align=right | 1.1 km || 
|-id=380 bgcolor=#d6d6d6
| 427380 ||  || — || October 26, 2009 || Mount Lemmon || Mount Lemmon Survey || — || align=right | 2.3 km || 
|-id=381 bgcolor=#E9E9E9
| 427381 ||  || — || December 18, 2001 || Socorro || LINEAR || MAR || align=right | 1.7 km || 
|-id=382 bgcolor=#E9E9E9
| 427382 ||  || — || October 26, 2009 || Mount Lemmon || Mount Lemmon Survey || — || align=right | 2.1 km || 
|-id=383 bgcolor=#d6d6d6
| 427383 ||  || — || March 12, 1996 || Kitt Peak || Spacewatch || — || align=right | 2.5 km || 
|-id=384 bgcolor=#d6d6d6
| 427384 ||  || — || June 12, 2012 || Mount Lemmon || Mount Lemmon Survey || — || align=right | 3.4 km || 
|-id=385 bgcolor=#d6d6d6
| 427385 ||  || — || November 22, 2009 || Catalina || CSS || — || align=right | 4.0 km || 
|-id=386 bgcolor=#d6d6d6
| 427386 ||  || — || October 22, 2003 || Kitt Peak || Spacewatch || — || align=right | 3.5 km || 
|-id=387 bgcolor=#E9E9E9
| 427387 ||  || — || November 28, 2005 || Catalina || CSS || — || align=right | 2.5 km || 
|-id=388 bgcolor=#fefefe
| 427388 ||  || — || June 13, 2005 || Mount Lemmon || Mount Lemmon Survey || H || align=right data-sort-value="0.86" | 860 m || 
|-id=389 bgcolor=#d6d6d6
| 427389 ||  || — || November 20, 2009 || Kitt Peak || Spacewatch || — || align=right | 2.7 km || 
|-id=390 bgcolor=#E9E9E9
| 427390 ||  || — || September 10, 2004 || Kitt Peak || Spacewatch || — || align=right | 2.2 km || 
|-id=391 bgcolor=#d6d6d6
| 427391 ||  || — || December 18, 2009 || Mount Lemmon || Mount Lemmon Survey || VER || align=right | 4.5 km || 
|-id=392 bgcolor=#d6d6d6
| 427392 ||  || — || March 12, 2010 || Catalina || CSS || — || align=right | 2.3 km || 
|-id=393 bgcolor=#d6d6d6
| 427393 ||  || — || December 19, 2003 || Kitt Peak || Spacewatch || — || align=right | 3.4 km || 
|-id=394 bgcolor=#d6d6d6
| 427394 ||  || — || September 20, 1995 || Kitt Peak || Spacewatch || — || align=right | 2.7 km || 
|-id=395 bgcolor=#E9E9E9
| 427395 ||  || — || October 20, 1995 || Kitt Peak || Spacewatch || — || align=right | 1.8 km || 
|-id=396 bgcolor=#E9E9E9
| 427396 || 1996 TA || — || October 1, 1996 || Sudbury || D. di Cicco || JUN || align=right | 1.2 km || 
|-id=397 bgcolor=#fefefe
| 427397 ||  || — || July 3, 1997 || Kitt Peak || Spacewatch || — || align=right data-sort-value="0.94" | 940 m || 
|-id=398 bgcolor=#fefefe
| 427398 ||  || — || September 23, 1997 || Kitt Peak || Spacewatch || — || align=right data-sort-value="0.76" | 760 m || 
|-id=399 bgcolor=#d6d6d6
| 427399 ||  || — || September 23, 1997 || Kitt Peak || Spacewatch || — || align=right | 2.3 km || 
|-id=400 bgcolor=#fefefe
| 427400 ||  || — || October 31, 1997 || Caussols || ODAS || — || align=right data-sort-value="0.65" | 650 m || 
|}

427401–427500 

|-bgcolor=#E9E9E9
| 427401 ||  || — || April 22, 1998 || Kitt Peak || Spacewatch || — || align=right | 2.0 km || 
|-id=402 bgcolor=#E9E9E9
| 427402 ||  || — || June 26, 1998 || Kitt Peak || Spacewatch || — || align=right | 4.1 km || 
|-id=403 bgcolor=#d6d6d6
| 427403 ||  || — || September 12, 1998 || Kitt Peak || Spacewatch || BRA || align=right | 1.9 km || 
|-id=404 bgcolor=#d6d6d6
| 427404 ||  || — || February 8, 1999 || Kitt Peak || Spacewatch || — || align=right | 2.3 km || 
|-id=405 bgcolor=#d6d6d6
| 427405 ||  || — || September 9, 1999 || Socorro || LINEAR || Tj (2.95) || align=right | 3.8 km || 
|-id=406 bgcolor=#fefefe
| 427406 ||  || — || September 9, 1999 || Socorro || LINEAR || — || align=right data-sort-value="0.83" | 830 m || 
|-id=407 bgcolor=#E9E9E9
| 427407 ||  || — || October 2, 1999 || Socorro || LINEAR || — || align=right | 2.8 km || 
|-id=408 bgcolor=#d6d6d6
| 427408 ||  || — || October 1, 1999 || Catalina || CSS || — || align=right | 2.0 km || 
|-id=409 bgcolor=#E9E9E9
| 427409 ||  || — || October 20, 1999 || Kitt Peak || Spacewatch || AGN || align=right | 1.3 km || 
|-id=410 bgcolor=#E9E9E9
| 427410 ||  || — || October 31, 1999 || Kitt Peak || Spacewatch || — || align=right | 2.0 km || 
|-id=411 bgcolor=#E9E9E9
| 427411 ||  || — || November 4, 1999 || Kitt Peak || Spacewatch || AGN || align=right | 1.4 km || 
|-id=412 bgcolor=#fefefe
| 427412 ||  || — || November 12, 1999 || Socorro || LINEAR || — || align=right data-sort-value="0.77" | 770 m || 
|-id=413 bgcolor=#d6d6d6
| 427413 ||  || — || December 7, 1999 || Socorro || LINEAR || — || align=right | 2.3 km || 
|-id=414 bgcolor=#E9E9E9
| 427414 ||  || — || November 29, 1999 || Kitt Peak || Spacewatch || — || align=right | 2.1 km || 
|-id=415 bgcolor=#fefefe
| 427415 ||  || — || December 31, 1999 || Kitt Peak || Spacewatch || MAS || align=right data-sort-value="0.65" | 650 m || 
|-id=416 bgcolor=#fefefe
| 427416 ||  || — || January 29, 2000 || Kitt Peak || Spacewatch || H || align=right data-sort-value="0.74" | 740 m || 
|-id=417 bgcolor=#fefefe
| 427417 ||  || — || February 27, 2000 || Kitt Peak || Spacewatch || — || align=right data-sort-value="0.68" | 680 m || 
|-id=418 bgcolor=#d6d6d6
| 427418 ||  || — || May 29, 2000 || Kitt Peak || Spacewatch || — || align=right | 3.4 km || 
|-id=419 bgcolor=#E9E9E9
| 427419 ||  || — || July 5, 2000 || Kitt Peak || Spacewatch || — || align=right | 1.0 km || 
|-id=420 bgcolor=#FA8072
| 427420 ||  || — || August 26, 2000 || Socorro || LINEAR || H || align=right data-sort-value="0.78" | 780 m || 
|-id=421 bgcolor=#E9E9E9
| 427421 ||  || — || August 26, 2000 || Socorro || LINEAR || (1547) || align=right | 1.9 km || 
|-id=422 bgcolor=#E9E9E9
| 427422 ||  || — || August 31, 2000 || Socorro || LINEAR || — || align=right | 1.8 km || 
|-id=423 bgcolor=#E9E9E9
| 427423 ||  || — || September 24, 2000 || Socorro || LINEAR || — || align=right | 1.2 km || 
|-id=424 bgcolor=#fefefe
| 427424 ||  || — || September 24, 2000 || Socorro || LINEAR || H || align=right data-sort-value="0.90" | 900 m || 
|-id=425 bgcolor=#fefefe
| 427425 ||  || — || September 24, 2000 || Socorro || LINEAR || H || align=right data-sort-value="0.61" | 610 m || 
|-id=426 bgcolor=#fefefe
| 427426 ||  || — || September 23, 2000 || Socorro || LINEAR || — || align=right data-sort-value="0.86" | 860 m || 
|-id=427 bgcolor=#E9E9E9
| 427427 ||  || — || September 20, 2000 || Haleakala || NEAT || — || align=right | 3.2 km || 
|-id=428 bgcolor=#fefefe
| 427428 ||  || — || September 19, 2000 || Haleakala || NEAT || — || align=right | 1.3 km || 
|-id=429 bgcolor=#E9E9E9
| 427429 ||  || — || September 30, 2000 || Socorro || LINEAR || — || align=right | 2.4 km || 
|-id=430 bgcolor=#d6d6d6
| 427430 ||  || — || September 23, 2000 || Socorro || LINEAR || — || align=right | 3.1 km || 
|-id=431 bgcolor=#E9E9E9
| 427431 ||  || — || October 2, 2000 || Kitt Peak || Spacewatch || — || align=right | 1.9 km || 
|-id=432 bgcolor=#E9E9E9
| 427432 ||  || — || October 1, 2000 || Socorro || LINEAR || — || align=right | 1.7 km || 
|-id=433 bgcolor=#E9E9E9
| 427433 ||  || — || October 25, 2000 || Socorro || LINEAR || — || align=right | 1.7 km || 
|-id=434 bgcolor=#E9E9E9
| 427434 ||  || — || November 24, 2000 || Kitt Peak || Spacewatch || — || align=right | 1.6 km || 
|-id=435 bgcolor=#E9E9E9
| 427435 ||  || — || January 27, 2001 || Haleakala || NEAT || — || align=right | 3.3 km || 
|-id=436 bgcolor=#fefefe
| 427436 ||  || — || February 16, 2001 || Kitt Peak || Spacewatch || — || align=right data-sort-value="0.54" | 540 m || 
|-id=437 bgcolor=#fefefe
| 427437 ||  || — || March 19, 2001 || Kitt Peak || Spacewatch || — || align=right data-sort-value="0.75" | 750 m || 
|-id=438 bgcolor=#E9E9E9
| 427438 ||  || — || March 18, 2001 || Socorro || LINEAR || — || align=right | 1.5 km || 
|-id=439 bgcolor=#d6d6d6
| 427439 ||  || — || March 21, 2001 || Kitt Peak || SKADS || KOR || align=right data-sort-value="0.97" | 970 m || 
|-id=440 bgcolor=#fefefe
| 427440 ||  || — || July 21, 2001 || Eskridge || G. Hug || — || align=right | 1.9 km || 
|-id=441 bgcolor=#fefefe
| 427441 ||  || — || July 23, 2001 || Haleakala || NEAT || — || align=right data-sort-value="0.99" | 990 m || 
|-id=442 bgcolor=#E9E9E9
| 427442 ||  || — || August 11, 2001 || Palomar || NEAT || — || align=right | 1.5 km || 
|-id=443 bgcolor=#fefefe
| 427443 ||  || — || August 16, 2001 || Socorro || LINEAR || — || align=right | 2.5 km || 
|-id=444 bgcolor=#fefefe
| 427444 ||  || — || August 17, 2001 || Palomar || NEAT || — || align=right | 2.1 km || 
|-id=445 bgcolor=#d6d6d6
| 427445 ||  || — || August 19, 2001 || Socorro || LINEAR || — || align=right | 3.6 km || 
|-id=446 bgcolor=#fefefe
| 427446 ||  || — || August 22, 2001 || Socorro || LINEAR || — || align=right | 1.2 km || 
|-id=447 bgcolor=#d6d6d6
| 427447 ||  || — || September 12, 2001 || Socorro || LINEAR || — || align=right | 3.7 km || 
|-id=448 bgcolor=#fefefe
| 427448 ||  || — || September 12, 2001 || Socorro || LINEAR || — || align=right | 1.2 km || 
|-id=449 bgcolor=#d6d6d6
| 427449 ||  || — || September 12, 2001 || Socorro || LINEAR || — || align=right | 4.0 km || 
|-id=450 bgcolor=#d6d6d6
| 427450 ||  || — || September 11, 2001 || Anderson Mesa || LONEOS || EOS || align=right | 1.9 km || 
|-id=451 bgcolor=#d6d6d6
| 427451 ||  || — || September 16, 2001 || Socorro || LINEAR || — || align=right | 3.2 km || 
|-id=452 bgcolor=#E9E9E9
| 427452 ||  || — || September 16, 2001 || Socorro || LINEAR || — || align=right | 1.8 km || 
|-id=453 bgcolor=#d6d6d6
| 427453 ||  || — || September 20, 2001 || Socorro || LINEAR || — || align=right | 3.5 km || 
|-id=454 bgcolor=#d6d6d6
| 427454 ||  || — || September 19, 2001 || Socorro || LINEAR || LIX || align=right | 3.4 km || 
|-id=455 bgcolor=#E9E9E9
| 427455 ||  || — || September 19, 2001 || Socorro || LINEAR || — || align=right data-sort-value="0.87" | 870 m || 
|-id=456 bgcolor=#fefefe
| 427456 ||  || — || September 19, 2001 || Socorro || LINEAR || — || align=right data-sort-value="0.98" | 980 m || 
|-id=457 bgcolor=#d6d6d6
| 427457 ||  || — || September 19, 2001 || Socorro || LINEAR || — || align=right | 3.9 km || 
|-id=458 bgcolor=#E9E9E9
| 427458 ||  || — || September 19, 2001 || Socorro || LINEAR || — || align=right | 1.7 km || 
|-id=459 bgcolor=#d6d6d6
| 427459 ||  || — || September 20, 2001 || Socorro || LINEAR || — || align=right | 3.4 km || 
|-id=460 bgcolor=#d6d6d6
| 427460 ||  || — || September 11, 2001 || Kitt Peak || Spacewatch || EOS || align=right | 2.2 km || 
|-id=461 bgcolor=#fefefe
| 427461 ||  || — || October 14, 2001 || Cima Ekar || ADAS || — || align=right data-sort-value="0.91" | 910 m || 
|-id=462 bgcolor=#fefefe
| 427462 ||  || — || August 26, 2001 || Anderson Mesa || LONEOS || — || align=right | 1.2 km || 
|-id=463 bgcolor=#fefefe
| 427463 ||  || — || October 14, 2001 || Socorro || LINEAR || — || align=right | 1.1 km || 
|-id=464 bgcolor=#E9E9E9
| 427464 ||  || — || October 17, 2001 || Socorro || LINEAR || — || align=right data-sort-value="0.78" | 780 m || 
|-id=465 bgcolor=#E9E9E9
| 427465 ||  || — || October 17, 2001 || Socorro || LINEAR || — || align=right | 1.1 km || 
|-id=466 bgcolor=#d6d6d6
| 427466 ||  || — || October 20, 2001 || Socorro || LINEAR || — || align=right | 3.9 km || 
|-id=467 bgcolor=#d6d6d6
| 427467 ||  || — || October 19, 2001 || Palomar || NEAT || — || align=right | 2.9 km || 
|-id=468 bgcolor=#d6d6d6
| 427468 ||  || — || October 19, 2001 || Palomar || NEAT || — || align=right | 3.0 km || 
|-id=469 bgcolor=#E9E9E9
| 427469 ||  || — || October 21, 2001 || Socorro || LINEAR || — || align=right | 1.8 km || 
|-id=470 bgcolor=#E9E9E9
| 427470 ||  || — || November 9, 2001 || Socorro || LINEAR || — || align=right data-sort-value="0.86" | 860 m || 
|-id=471 bgcolor=#E9E9E9
| 427471 ||  || — || November 15, 2001 || Socorro || LINEAR || JUN || align=right | 1.4 km || 
|-id=472 bgcolor=#E9E9E9
| 427472 ||  || — || November 12, 2001 || Socorro || LINEAR || — || align=right | 1.5 km || 
|-id=473 bgcolor=#fefefe
| 427473 ||  || — || November 11, 2001 || Apache Point || SDSS || — || align=right data-sort-value="0.69" | 690 m || 
|-id=474 bgcolor=#d6d6d6
| 427474 ||  || — || November 20, 2001 || Socorro || LINEAR || — || align=right | 3.5 km || 
|-id=475 bgcolor=#E9E9E9
| 427475 ||  || — || November 20, 2001 || Socorro || LINEAR || — || align=right data-sort-value="0.76" | 760 m || 
|-id=476 bgcolor=#E9E9E9
| 427476 ||  || — || November 20, 2001 || Socorro || LINEAR || — || align=right data-sort-value="0.73" | 730 m || 
|-id=477 bgcolor=#E9E9E9
| 427477 ||  || — || December 10, 2001 || Socorro || LINEAR || — || align=right | 1.4 km || 
|-id=478 bgcolor=#E9E9E9
| 427478 ||  || — || December 10, 2001 || Socorro || LINEAR || — || align=right | 1.0 km || 
|-id=479 bgcolor=#E9E9E9
| 427479 ||  || — || December 10, 2001 || Socorro || LINEAR || KON || align=right | 2.9 km || 
|-id=480 bgcolor=#E9E9E9
| 427480 ||  || — || December 10, 2001 || Socorro || LINEAR || — || align=right | 1.1 km || 
|-id=481 bgcolor=#E9E9E9
| 427481 ||  || — || December 13, 2001 || Socorro || LINEAR || — || align=right data-sort-value="0.90" | 900 m || 
|-id=482 bgcolor=#E9E9E9
| 427482 ||  || — || December 14, 2001 || Socorro || LINEAR || — || align=right | 1.7 km || 
|-id=483 bgcolor=#E9E9E9
| 427483 ||  || — || December 14, 2001 || Socorro || LINEAR || (1547) || align=right | 1.5 km || 
|-id=484 bgcolor=#E9E9E9
| 427484 ||  || — || December 14, 2001 || Socorro || LINEAR || BRG || align=right | 1.6 km || 
|-id=485 bgcolor=#E9E9E9
| 427485 ||  || — || December 11, 2001 || Socorro || LINEAR || — || align=right | 1.6 km || 
|-id=486 bgcolor=#E9E9E9
| 427486 ||  || — || November 11, 2001 || Socorro || LINEAR || — || align=right | 1.9 km || 
|-id=487 bgcolor=#E9E9E9
| 427487 ||  || — || January 8, 2002 || Socorro || LINEAR || — || align=right | 1.6 km || 
|-id=488 bgcolor=#E9E9E9
| 427488 ||  || — || January 9, 2002 || Socorro || LINEAR || — || align=right | 1.7 km || 
|-id=489 bgcolor=#E9E9E9
| 427489 ||  || — || January 9, 2002 || Socorro || LINEAR || — || align=right | 1.5 km || 
|-id=490 bgcolor=#E9E9E9
| 427490 ||  || — || January 13, 2002 || Socorro || LINEAR || (194) || align=right | 1.3 km || 
|-id=491 bgcolor=#E9E9E9
| 427491 ||  || — || January 8, 2002 || Socorro || LINEAR || — || align=right | 1.3 km || 
|-id=492 bgcolor=#E9E9E9
| 427492 ||  || — || January 9, 2002 || Kitt Peak || Spacewatch || — || align=right | 1.7 km || 
|-id=493 bgcolor=#E9E9E9
| 427493 ||  || — || January 23, 2002 || Socorro || LINEAR || — || align=right | 3.0 km || 
|-id=494 bgcolor=#FA8072
| 427494 ||  || — || January 25, 2002 || Socorro || LINEAR || — || align=right data-sort-value="0.71" | 710 m || 
|-id=495 bgcolor=#E9E9E9
| 427495 ||  || — || January 21, 2002 || Anderson Mesa || LONEOS || JUN || align=right | 1.0 km || 
|-id=496 bgcolor=#E9E9E9
| 427496 ||  || — || January 20, 2002 || Palomar || NEAT || — || align=right data-sort-value="0.99" | 990 m || 
|-id=497 bgcolor=#fefefe
| 427497 ||  || — || February 7, 2002 || Socorro || LINEAR || H || align=right data-sort-value="0.79" | 790 m || 
|-id=498 bgcolor=#fefefe
| 427498 ||  || — || February 6, 2002 || Socorro || LINEAR || H || align=right data-sort-value="0.82" | 820 m || 
|-id=499 bgcolor=#FFC2E0
| 427499 ||  || — || February 12, 2002 || Palomar || NEAT || AMO || align=right data-sort-value="0.51" | 510 m || 
|-id=500 bgcolor=#E9E9E9
| 427500 ||  || — || January 13, 2002 || Socorro || LINEAR || JUN || align=right | 1.0 km || 
|}

427501–427600 

|-bgcolor=#E9E9E9
| 427501 ||  || — || February 8, 2002 || Socorro || LINEAR || — || align=right | 1.6 km || 
|-id=502 bgcolor=#E9E9E9
| 427502 ||  || — || February 10, 2002 || Socorro || LINEAR || ADE || align=right | 3.0 km || 
|-id=503 bgcolor=#E9E9E9
| 427503 ||  || — || January 14, 2002 || Kitt Peak || Spacewatch || EUN || align=right | 1.4 km || 
|-id=504 bgcolor=#E9E9E9
| 427504 ||  || — || February 7, 2002 || Socorro || LINEAR || — || align=right | 2.4 km || 
|-id=505 bgcolor=#fefefe
| 427505 ||  || — || February 7, 2002 || Socorro || LINEAR || H || align=right data-sort-value="0.72" | 720 m || 
|-id=506 bgcolor=#E9E9E9
| 427506 ||  || — || February 8, 2002 || Socorro || LINEAR || — || align=right | 1.1 km || 
|-id=507 bgcolor=#C7FF8F
| 427507 ||  || — || February 20, 2002 || Kitt Peak || Spacewatch || centaur || align=right | 42 km || 
|-id=508 bgcolor=#E9E9E9
| 427508 ||  || — || February 20, 2002 || Socorro || LINEAR || — || align=right | 1.8 km || 
|-id=509 bgcolor=#fefefe
| 427509 ||  || — || February 22, 2002 || Palomar || NEAT || H || align=right data-sort-value="0.84" | 840 m || 
|-id=510 bgcolor=#E9E9E9
| 427510 ||  || — || March 6, 2002 || Siding Spring || R. H. McNaught || — || align=right | 1.4 km || 
|-id=511 bgcolor=#E9E9E9
| 427511 ||  || — || March 11, 2002 || Palomar || NEAT || EUN || align=right | 1.3 km || 
|-id=512 bgcolor=#E9E9E9
| 427512 ||  || — || March 9, 2002 || Anderson Mesa || LONEOS || — || align=right | 1.3 km || 
|-id=513 bgcolor=#E9E9E9
| 427513 ||  || — || March 10, 2002 || Kitt Peak || Spacewatch || EUN || align=right | 1.4 km || 
|-id=514 bgcolor=#E9E9E9
| 427514 ||  || — || March 10, 2002 || Kitt Peak || Spacewatch || — || align=right | 1.3 km || 
|-id=515 bgcolor=#FA8072
| 427515 ||  || — || March 16, 2002 || Socorro || LINEAR || H || align=right data-sort-value="0.85" | 850 m || 
|-id=516 bgcolor=#fefefe
| 427516 ||  || — || April 4, 2002 || Kleť || Kleť Obs. || H || align=right data-sort-value="0.73" | 730 m || 
|-id=517 bgcolor=#fefefe
| 427517 ||  || — || April 9, 2002 || Socorro || LINEAR || H || align=right data-sort-value="0.94" | 940 m || 
|-id=518 bgcolor=#fefefe
| 427518 ||  || — || April 14, 2002 || Socorro || LINEAR || H || align=right data-sort-value="0.87" | 870 m || 
|-id=519 bgcolor=#E9E9E9
| 427519 ||  || — || April 8, 2002 || Palomar || NEAT || JUN || align=right | 1.1 km || 
|-id=520 bgcolor=#E9E9E9
| 427520 ||  || — || April 12, 2002 || Socorro || LINEAR || — || align=right | 1.4 km || 
|-id=521 bgcolor=#FA8072
| 427521 ||  || — || May 6, 2002 || Palomar || NEAT || — || align=right | 2.1 km || 
|-id=522 bgcolor=#E9E9E9
| 427522 ||  || — || May 14, 2002 || Palomar || NEAT || — || align=right | 1.7 km || 
|-id=523 bgcolor=#fefefe
| 427523 ||  || — || May 9, 2002 || Palomar || NEAT || H || align=right data-sort-value="0.90" | 900 m || 
|-id=524 bgcolor=#E9E9E9
| 427524 ||  || — || May 8, 2002 || Socorro || LINEAR || — || align=right | 1.8 km || 
|-id=525 bgcolor=#fefefe
| 427525 ||  || — || June 20, 2002 || Kitt Peak || Spacewatch || H || align=right data-sort-value="0.52" | 520 m || 
|-id=526 bgcolor=#fefefe
| 427526 ||  || — || July 13, 2002 || Socorro || LINEAR || — || align=right | 1.1 km || 
|-id=527 bgcolor=#d6d6d6
| 427527 ||  || — || July 5, 2002 || Palomar || NEAT || — || align=right | 2.5 km || 
|-id=528 bgcolor=#d6d6d6
| 427528 ||  || — || July 20, 2002 || Palomar || NEAT || — || align=right | 3.3 km || 
|-id=529 bgcolor=#E9E9E9
| 427529 ||  || — || July 22, 2002 || Palomar || NEAT || — || align=right | 2.6 km || 
|-id=530 bgcolor=#fefefe
| 427530 ||  || — || August 4, 2002 || Palomar || NEAT || — || align=right | 1.1 km || 
|-id=531 bgcolor=#fefefe
| 427531 ||  || — || August 8, 2002 || Palomar || NEAT || — || align=right data-sort-value="0.74" | 740 m || 
|-id=532 bgcolor=#E9E9E9
| 427532 ||  || — || August 8, 2002 || Palomar || NEAT || — || align=right | 2.3 km || 
|-id=533 bgcolor=#d6d6d6
| 427533 ||  || — || August 26, 2002 || Palomar || NEAT || — || align=right | 2.9 km || 
|-id=534 bgcolor=#d6d6d6
| 427534 ||  || — || August 17, 2002 || Palomar || A. Lowe || — || align=right | 2.7 km || 
|-id=535 bgcolor=#E9E9E9
| 427535 ||  || — || August 16, 2002 || Palomar || NEAT || DOR || align=right | 2.9 km || 
|-id=536 bgcolor=#fefefe
| 427536 ||  || — || August 28, 2002 || Palomar || NEAT || — || align=right data-sort-value="0.65" | 650 m || 
|-id=537 bgcolor=#fefefe
| 427537 ||  || — || August 28, 2002 || Palomar || NEAT || — || align=right data-sort-value="0.80" | 800 m || 
|-id=538 bgcolor=#d6d6d6
| 427538 ||  || — || August 30, 2002 || Palomar || NEAT || BRA || align=right | 1.4 km || 
|-id=539 bgcolor=#d6d6d6
| 427539 ||  || — || August 17, 2002 || Palomar || NEAT || — || align=right | 2.8 km || 
|-id=540 bgcolor=#d6d6d6
| 427540 ||  || — || August 17, 2002 || Palomar || NEAT || — || align=right | 2.7 km || 
|-id=541 bgcolor=#d6d6d6
| 427541 ||  || — || September 2, 2002 || Palomar || NEAT || — || align=right | 2.9 km || 
|-id=542 bgcolor=#d6d6d6
| 427542 ||  || — || September 13, 2002 || Palomar || NEAT || — || align=right | 3.2 km || 
|-id=543 bgcolor=#fefefe
| 427543 ||  || — || September 13, 2002 || Socorro || LINEAR || — || align=right data-sort-value="0.81" | 810 m || 
|-id=544 bgcolor=#fefefe
| 427544 ||  || — || September 14, 2002 || Palomar || R. Matson || — || align=right data-sort-value="0.61" | 610 m || 
|-id=545 bgcolor=#fefefe
| 427545 ||  || — || September 10, 2002 || Palomar || NEAT || H || align=right data-sort-value="0.74" | 740 m || 
|-id=546 bgcolor=#fefefe
| 427546 ||  || — || September 4, 2002 || Palomar || NEAT || — || align=right data-sort-value="0.65" | 650 m || 
|-id=547 bgcolor=#fefefe
| 427547 ||  || — || September 27, 2002 || Palomar || NEAT || — || align=right data-sort-value="0.87" | 870 m || 
|-id=548 bgcolor=#fefefe
| 427548 ||  || — || September 28, 2002 || Haleakala || NEAT || NYS || align=right data-sort-value="0.68" | 680 m || 
|-id=549 bgcolor=#d6d6d6
| 427549 ||  || — || October 1, 2002 || Anderson Mesa || LONEOS || Tj (2.92) || align=right | 2.9 km || 
|-id=550 bgcolor=#fefefe
| 427550 ||  || — || October 4, 2002 || Socorro || LINEAR || — || align=right data-sort-value="0.74" | 740 m || 
|-id=551 bgcolor=#fefefe
| 427551 ||  || — || October 4, 2002 || Socorro || LINEAR || — || align=right data-sort-value="0.78" | 780 m || 
|-id=552 bgcolor=#d6d6d6
| 427552 ||  || — || October 3, 2002 || Socorro || LINEAR || — || align=right | 2.9 km || 
|-id=553 bgcolor=#d6d6d6
| 427553 ||  || — || October 5, 2002 || Apache Point || SDSS || — || align=right | 2.4 km || 
|-id=554 bgcolor=#fefefe
| 427554 ||  || — || October 5, 2002 || Apache Point || SDSS || — || align=right data-sort-value="0.78" | 780 m || 
|-id=555 bgcolor=#d6d6d6
| 427555 ||  || — || October 10, 2002 || Apache Point || SDSS || — || align=right | 3.6 km || 
|-id=556 bgcolor=#fefefe
| 427556 ||  || — || October 30, 2002 || Haleakala || NEAT || V || align=right data-sort-value="0.78" | 780 m || 
|-id=557 bgcolor=#d6d6d6
| 427557 ||  || — || October 29, 2002 || Apache Point || SDSS || — || align=right | 2.4 km || 
|-id=558 bgcolor=#d6d6d6
| 427558 ||  || — || October 29, 2002 || Apache Point || SDSS || — || align=right | 3.3 km || 
|-id=559 bgcolor=#d6d6d6
| 427559 ||  || — || October 29, 2002 || Palomar || NEAT || — || align=right | 2.4 km || 
|-id=560 bgcolor=#fefefe
| 427560 ||  || — || November 5, 2002 || Palomar || NEAT || — || align=right data-sort-value="0.82" | 820 m || 
|-id=561 bgcolor=#fefefe
| 427561 ||  || — || November 6, 2002 || Socorro || LINEAR || — || align=right data-sort-value="0.81" | 810 m || 
|-id=562 bgcolor=#d6d6d6
| 427562 ||  || — || November 7, 2002 || Socorro || LINEAR || — || align=right | 2.7 km || 
|-id=563 bgcolor=#d6d6d6
| 427563 ||  || — || November 13, 2002 || Palomar || NEAT || — || align=right | 3.3 km || 
|-id=564 bgcolor=#d6d6d6
| 427564 ||  || — || November 14, 2002 || Palomar || NEAT || — || align=right | 2.5 km || 
|-id=565 bgcolor=#d6d6d6
| 427565 ||  || — || November 24, 2002 || Palomar || NEAT || — || align=right | 2.6 km || 
|-id=566 bgcolor=#d6d6d6
| 427566 ||  || — || November 16, 2002 || Palomar || NEAT || — || align=right | 3.3 km || 
|-id=567 bgcolor=#d6d6d6
| 427567 ||  || — || January 5, 2003 || Socorro || LINEAR || — || align=right | 3.3 km || 
|-id=568 bgcolor=#d6d6d6
| 427568 ||  || — || January 23, 2003 || La Silla || A. Boattini, H. Scholl || — || align=right | 3.3 km || 
|-id=569 bgcolor=#d6d6d6
| 427569 ||  || — || February 9, 2003 || Haleakala || NEAT || 7:4 || align=right | 3.2 km || 
|-id=570 bgcolor=#E9E9E9
| 427570 ||  || — || March 7, 2003 || Socorro || LINEAR || — || align=right | 1.1 km || 
|-id=571 bgcolor=#E9E9E9
| 427571 ||  || — || March 10, 2003 || Kitt Peak || Spacewatch || — || align=right data-sort-value="0.83" | 830 m || 
|-id=572 bgcolor=#E9E9E9
| 427572 ||  || — || March 11, 2003 || Kitt Peak || Spacewatch || — || align=right data-sort-value="0.93" | 930 m || 
|-id=573 bgcolor=#E9E9E9
| 427573 ||  || — || March 23, 2003 || Haleakala || NEAT || — || align=right | 2.0 km || 
|-id=574 bgcolor=#E9E9E9
| 427574 ||  || — || March 25, 2003 || Palomar || NEAT || — || align=right | 1.1 km || 
|-id=575 bgcolor=#E9E9E9
| 427575 ||  || — || March 23, 2003 || Kitt Peak || Spacewatch || — || align=right data-sort-value="0.81" | 810 m || 
|-id=576 bgcolor=#E9E9E9
| 427576 ||  || — || June 29, 2003 || Socorro || LINEAR || — || align=right | 2.0 km || 
|-id=577 bgcolor=#E9E9E9
| 427577 ||  || — || July 25, 2003 || Campo Imperatore || CINEOS || — || align=right | 3.5 km || 
|-id=578 bgcolor=#E9E9E9
| 427578 ||  || — || August 19, 2003 || Campo Imperatore || CINEOS || — || align=right | 2.2 km || 
|-id=579 bgcolor=#E9E9E9
| 427579 ||  || — || August 20, 2003 || Palomar || NEAT || DOR || align=right | 2.8 km || 
|-id=580 bgcolor=#FA8072
| 427580 ||  || — || August 23, 2003 || Palomar || NEAT || — || align=right | 1.3 km || 
|-id=581 bgcolor=#C2E0FF
| 427581 ||  || — || August 24, 2003 || Cerro Tololo || M. W. Buie || res4:5critical || align=right | 117 km || 
|-id=582 bgcolor=#fefefe
| 427582 ||  || — || August 27, 2003 || Palomar || NEAT || — || align=right | 1.2 km || 
|-id=583 bgcolor=#FA8072
| 427583 ||  || — || August 23, 2003 || Socorro || LINEAR || — || align=right data-sort-value="0.84" | 840 m || 
|-id=584 bgcolor=#FA8072
| 427584 ||  || — || September 13, 2003 || Haleakala || NEAT || — || align=right data-sort-value="0.70" | 700 m || 
|-id=585 bgcolor=#E9E9E9
| 427585 ||  || — || September 15, 2003 || Anderson Mesa || LONEOS || — || align=right | 1.8 km || 
|-id=586 bgcolor=#fefefe
| 427586 ||  || — || September 18, 2003 || Kitt Peak || Spacewatch || — || align=right data-sort-value="0.65" | 650 m || 
|-id=587 bgcolor=#fefefe
| 427587 ||  || — || September 18, 2003 || Palomar || NEAT || — || align=right | 1.6 km || 
|-id=588 bgcolor=#fefefe
| 427588 ||  || — || September 19, 2003 || Socorro || LINEAR || V || align=right data-sort-value="0.72" | 720 m || 
|-id=589 bgcolor=#d6d6d6
| 427589 ||  || — || August 30, 2003 || Kitt Peak || Spacewatch || — || align=right | 1.8 km || 
|-id=590 bgcolor=#d6d6d6
| 427590 ||  || — || September 18, 2003 || Kitt Peak || Spacewatch || — || align=right | 2.2 km || 
|-id=591 bgcolor=#fefefe
| 427591 ||  || — || September 18, 2003 || Kitt Peak || Spacewatch || — || align=right data-sort-value="0.64" | 640 m || 
|-id=592 bgcolor=#fefefe
| 427592 ||  || — || September 16, 2003 || Anderson Mesa || LONEOS || — || align=right data-sort-value="0.80" | 800 m || 
|-id=593 bgcolor=#fefefe
| 427593 ||  || — || September 16, 2003 || Kitt Peak || Spacewatch || — || align=right data-sort-value="0.80" | 800 m || 
|-id=594 bgcolor=#d6d6d6
| 427594 ||  || — || September 17, 2003 || Campo Imperatore || CINEOS || — || align=right | 3.0 km || 
|-id=595 bgcolor=#E9E9E9
| 427595 ||  || — || September 18, 2003 || Campo Imperatore || CINEOS || — || align=right | 3.1 km || 
|-id=596 bgcolor=#fefefe
| 427596 ||  || — || September 21, 2003 || Campo Imperatore || CINEOS || H || align=right data-sort-value="0.72" | 720 m || 
|-id=597 bgcolor=#fefefe
| 427597 ||  || — || September 21, 2003 || Kitt Peak || Spacewatch || — || align=right data-sort-value="0.57" | 570 m || 
|-id=598 bgcolor=#fefefe
| 427598 ||  || — || September 19, 2003 || Palomar || NEAT || — || align=right data-sort-value="0.67" | 670 m || 
|-id=599 bgcolor=#fefefe
| 427599 ||  || — || September 19, 2003 || Palomar || NEAT || — || align=right data-sort-value="0.89" | 890 m || 
|-id=600 bgcolor=#fefefe
| 427600 ||  || — || September 17, 2003 || Kitt Peak || Spacewatch || — || align=right data-sort-value="0.59" | 590 m || 
|}

427601–427700 

|-bgcolor=#fefefe
| 427601 ||  || — || September 26, 2003 || Junk Bond || Junk Bond Obs. || — || align=right data-sort-value="0.63" | 630 m || 
|-id=602 bgcolor=#FA8072
| 427602 ||  || — || September 23, 2003 || Palomar || NEAT || — || align=right data-sort-value="0.97" | 970 m || 
|-id=603 bgcolor=#fefefe
| 427603 ||  || — || September 29, 2003 || Kitt Peak || Spacewatch || H || align=right data-sort-value="0.57" | 570 m || 
|-id=604 bgcolor=#fefefe
| 427604 ||  || — || September 28, 2003 || Kitt Peak || Spacewatch || — || align=right data-sort-value="0.74" | 740 m || 
|-id=605 bgcolor=#E9E9E9
| 427605 ||  || — || September 28, 2003 || Kitt Peak || Spacewatch || — || align=right | 2.6 km || 
|-id=606 bgcolor=#fefefe
| 427606 ||  || — || September 19, 2003 || Kitt Peak || Spacewatch || — || align=right data-sort-value="0.79" | 790 m || 
|-id=607 bgcolor=#fefefe
| 427607 ||  || — || September 18, 2003 || Kitt Peak || Spacewatch || — || align=right data-sort-value="0.68" | 680 m || 
|-id=608 bgcolor=#E9E9E9
| 427608 ||  || — || September 20, 2003 || Socorro || LINEAR || — || align=right | 2.6 km || 
|-id=609 bgcolor=#fefefe
| 427609 ||  || — || September 17, 2003 || Palomar || NEAT || — || align=right data-sort-value="0.65" | 650 m || 
|-id=610 bgcolor=#fefefe
| 427610 ||  || — || September 21, 2003 || Anderson Mesa || LONEOS || — || align=right data-sort-value="0.65" | 650 m || 
|-id=611 bgcolor=#fefefe
| 427611 ||  || — || September 26, 2003 || Apache Point || SDSS || — || align=right data-sort-value="0.90" | 900 m || 
|-id=612 bgcolor=#fefefe
| 427612 ||  || — || September 28, 2003 || Kitt Peak || Spacewatch || — || align=right data-sort-value="0.52" | 520 m || 
|-id=613 bgcolor=#d6d6d6
| 427613 ||  || — || September 28, 2003 || Apache Point || SDSS || — || align=right | 2.1 km || 
|-id=614 bgcolor=#C2E0FF
| 427614 ||  || — || September 28, 2003 || Cerro Tololo || Cerro Tololo Obs. || other TNOcritical || align=right | 168 km || 
|-id=615 bgcolor=#E9E9E9
| 427615 ||  || — || September 21, 2003 || Kitt Peak || Spacewatch || AST || align=right | 1.6 km || 
|-id=616 bgcolor=#d6d6d6
| 427616 ||  || — || September 27, 2003 || Kitt Peak || Spacewatch || — || align=right | 2.4 km || 
|-id=617 bgcolor=#d6d6d6
| 427617 ||  || — || September 28, 2003 || Anderson Mesa || LONEOS || — || align=right | 2.9 km || 
|-id=618 bgcolor=#fefefe
| 427618 ||  || — || October 14, 2003 || Palomar || NEAT || — || align=right | 1.0 km || 
|-id=619 bgcolor=#fefefe
| 427619 ||  || — || October 3, 2003 || Kitt Peak || Spacewatch || — || align=right data-sort-value="0.64" | 640 m || 
|-id=620 bgcolor=#fefefe
| 427620 ||  || — || October 18, 2003 || Palomar || NEAT || H || align=right data-sort-value="0.78" | 780 m || 
|-id=621 bgcolor=#FFC2E0
| 427621 ||  || — || October 21, 2003 || Kitt Peak || Spacewatch || AMO || align=right data-sort-value="0.78" | 780 m || 
|-id=622 bgcolor=#fefefe
| 427622 ||  || — || October 17, 2003 || Kitt Peak || Spacewatch || H || align=right data-sort-value="0.55" | 550 m || 
|-id=623 bgcolor=#d6d6d6
| 427623 ||  || — || October 18, 2003 || Kitt Peak || Spacewatch || — || align=right | 2.4 km || 
|-id=624 bgcolor=#FA8072
| 427624 ||  || — || September 3, 2003 || Socorro || LINEAR || — || align=right | 1.0 km || 
|-id=625 bgcolor=#d6d6d6
| 427625 ||  || — || October 18, 2003 || Kitt Peak || Spacewatch || — || align=right | 1.8 km || 
|-id=626 bgcolor=#d6d6d6
| 427626 ||  || — || October 20, 2003 || Palomar || NEAT || — || align=right | 2.6 km || 
|-id=627 bgcolor=#d6d6d6
| 427627 ||  || — || September 19, 2003 || Anderson Mesa || LONEOS || — || align=right | 3.3 km || 
|-id=628 bgcolor=#d6d6d6
| 427628 ||  || — || October 19, 2003 || Kitt Peak || Spacewatch || — || align=right | 2.0 km || 
|-id=629 bgcolor=#fefefe
| 427629 ||  || — || October 18, 2003 || Anderson Mesa || LONEOS || H || align=right data-sort-value="0.81" | 810 m || 
|-id=630 bgcolor=#fefefe
| 427630 ||  || — || October 18, 2003 || Anderson Mesa || LONEOS || — || align=right data-sort-value="0.85" | 850 m || 
|-id=631 bgcolor=#fefefe
| 427631 ||  || — || October 18, 2003 || Kitt Peak || Spacewatch || — || align=right data-sort-value="0.93" | 930 m || 
|-id=632 bgcolor=#fefefe
| 427632 ||  || — || October 20, 2003 || Kitt Peak || Spacewatch || — || align=right data-sort-value="0.73" | 730 m || 
|-id=633 bgcolor=#fefefe
| 427633 ||  || — || October 21, 2003 || Kitt Peak || Spacewatch || — || align=right data-sort-value="0.78" | 780 m || 
|-id=634 bgcolor=#fefefe
| 427634 ||  || — || October 21, 2003 || Kitt Peak || Spacewatch || V || align=right data-sort-value="0.83" | 830 m || 
|-id=635 bgcolor=#fefefe
| 427635 ||  || — || October 2, 2003 || Kitt Peak || Spacewatch || NYS || align=right data-sort-value="0.61" | 610 m || 
|-id=636 bgcolor=#fefefe
| 427636 ||  || — || October 16, 2003 || Anderson Mesa || LONEOS || — || align=right data-sort-value="0.82" | 820 m || 
|-id=637 bgcolor=#fefefe
| 427637 ||  || — || October 23, 2003 || Anderson Mesa || LONEOS || — || align=right data-sort-value="0.76" | 760 m || 
|-id=638 bgcolor=#fefefe
| 427638 ||  || — || October 24, 2003 || Socorro || LINEAR || — || align=right data-sort-value="0.71" | 710 m || 
|-id=639 bgcolor=#FA8072
| 427639 ||  || — || October 25, 2003 || Socorro || LINEAR || — || align=right data-sort-value="0.76" | 760 m || 
|-id=640 bgcolor=#fefefe
| 427640 ||  || — || October 19, 2003 || Apache Point || SDSS || — || align=right data-sort-value="0.60" | 600 m || 
|-id=641 bgcolor=#fefefe
| 427641 ||  || — || October 19, 2003 || Apache Point || SDSS || — || align=right data-sort-value="0.57" | 570 m || 
|-id=642 bgcolor=#E9E9E9
| 427642 ||  || — || October 22, 2003 || Apache Point || SDSS || — || align=right | 1.9 km || 
|-id=643 bgcolor=#FFC2E0
| 427643 ||  || — || November 5, 2003 || Socorro || LINEAR || AMO +1km || align=right | 1.2 km || 
|-id=644 bgcolor=#fefefe
| 427644 ||  || — || October 25, 2003 || Socorro || LINEAR || H || align=right data-sort-value="0.62" | 620 m || 
|-id=645 bgcolor=#E9E9E9
| 427645 ||  || — || November 18, 2003 || Kitt Peak || Spacewatch || — || align=right | 2.8 km || 
|-id=646 bgcolor=#d6d6d6
| 427646 ||  || — || November 19, 2003 || Socorro || LINEAR || — || align=right | 2.2 km || 
|-id=647 bgcolor=#d6d6d6
| 427647 ||  || — || November 19, 2003 || Kitt Peak || Spacewatch || — || align=right | 3.8 km || 
|-id=648 bgcolor=#fefefe
| 427648 ||  || — || November 19, 2003 || Anderson Mesa || LONEOS || — || align=right data-sort-value="0.69" | 690 m || 
|-id=649 bgcolor=#d6d6d6
| 427649 ||  || — || December 14, 2003 || Kitt Peak || Spacewatch || — || align=right | 2.2 km || 
|-id=650 bgcolor=#fefefe
| 427650 ||  || — || December 17, 2003 || Socorro || LINEAR || H || align=right data-sort-value="0.59" | 590 m || 
|-id=651 bgcolor=#fefefe
| 427651 ||  || — || December 19, 2003 || Socorro || LINEAR || H || align=right data-sort-value="0.97" | 970 m || 
|-id=652 bgcolor=#fefefe
| 427652 ||  || — || December 17, 2003 || Socorro || LINEAR || — || align=right data-sort-value="0.83" | 830 m || 
|-id=653 bgcolor=#d6d6d6
| 427653 ||  || — || December 17, 2003 || Palomar || NEAT || — || align=right | 3.1 km || 
|-id=654 bgcolor=#fefefe
| 427654 ||  || — || December 19, 2003 || Kitt Peak || Spacewatch || — || align=right data-sort-value="0.98" | 980 m || 
|-id=655 bgcolor=#d6d6d6
| 427655 ||  || — || December 19, 2003 || Kitt Peak || Spacewatch || — || align=right | 2.4 km || 
|-id=656 bgcolor=#fefefe
| 427656 ||  || — || December 4, 2003 || Socorro || LINEAR || — || align=right data-sort-value="0.75" | 750 m || 
|-id=657 bgcolor=#d6d6d6
| 427657 ||  || — || December 28, 2003 || Socorro || LINEAR || — || align=right | 3.7 km || 
|-id=658 bgcolor=#d6d6d6
| 427658 ||  || — || December 30, 2003 || Socorro || LINEAR || — || align=right | 2.5 km || 
|-id=659 bgcolor=#d6d6d6
| 427659 ||  || — || December 17, 2003 || Kitt Peak || Spacewatch || — || align=right | 2.7 km || 
|-id=660 bgcolor=#d6d6d6
| 427660 ||  || — || December 17, 2003 || Kitt Peak || Spacewatch || — || align=right | 2.1 km || 
|-id=661 bgcolor=#d6d6d6
| 427661 ||  || — || December 29, 2003 || Kitt Peak || Spacewatch || — || align=right | 3.0 km || 
|-id=662 bgcolor=#fefefe
| 427662 ||  || — || January 18, 2004 || Palomar || NEAT || — || align=right data-sort-value="0.95" | 950 m || 
|-id=663 bgcolor=#fefefe
| 427663 ||  || — || January 19, 2004 || Socorro || LINEAR || — || align=right | 1.3 km || 
|-id=664 bgcolor=#d6d6d6
| 427664 ||  || — || January 19, 2004 || Kitt Peak || Spacewatch || THM || align=right | 2.3 km || 
|-id=665 bgcolor=#d6d6d6
| 427665 ||  || — || January 21, 2004 || Socorro || LINEAR || — || align=right | 3.4 km || 
|-id=666 bgcolor=#d6d6d6
| 427666 ||  || — || December 19, 2003 || Kitt Peak || Spacewatch || — || align=right | 3.4 km || 
|-id=667 bgcolor=#fefefe
| 427667 ||  || — || January 22, 2004 || Socorro || LINEAR || NYS || align=right data-sort-value="0.48" | 480 m || 
|-id=668 bgcolor=#fefefe
| 427668 ||  || — || January 22, 2004 || Socorro || LINEAR || NYS || align=right data-sort-value="0.59" | 590 m || 
|-id=669 bgcolor=#fefefe
| 427669 ||  || — || January 28, 2004 || Kitt Peak || Spacewatch || — || align=right data-sort-value="0.78" | 780 m || 
|-id=670 bgcolor=#d6d6d6
| 427670 ||  || — || December 18, 2003 || Kitt Peak || Spacewatch || — || align=right | 3.2 km || 
|-id=671 bgcolor=#d6d6d6
| 427671 ||  || — || January 17, 2004 || Kitt Peak || Spacewatch || — || align=right | 3.3 km || 
|-id=672 bgcolor=#d6d6d6
| 427672 ||  || — || January 19, 2004 || Kitt Peak || Spacewatch || TEL || align=right | 1.5 km || 
|-id=673 bgcolor=#d6d6d6
| 427673 ||  || — || January 19, 2004 || Kitt Peak || Spacewatch || EOS || align=right | 3.1 km || 
|-id=674 bgcolor=#fefefe
| 427674 ||  || — || February 11, 2004 || Kitt Peak || Spacewatch || NYS || align=right data-sort-value="0.57" | 570 m || 
|-id=675 bgcolor=#d6d6d6
| 427675 ||  || — || January 22, 2004 || Socorro || LINEAR || — || align=right | 2.6 km || 
|-id=676 bgcolor=#fefefe
| 427676 ||  || — || February 13, 2004 || Kitt Peak || Spacewatch || — || align=right data-sort-value="0.74" | 740 m || 
|-id=677 bgcolor=#fefefe
| 427677 ||  || — || January 28, 2004 || Catalina || CSS || — || align=right | 1.0 km || 
|-id=678 bgcolor=#d6d6d6
| 427678 ||  || — || February 13, 2004 || Palomar || NEAT || — || align=right | 4.6 km || 
|-id=679 bgcolor=#d6d6d6
| 427679 ||  || — || February 13, 2004 || Palomar || NEAT || — || align=right | 3.2 km || 
|-id=680 bgcolor=#fefefe
| 427680 ||  || — || February 12, 2004 || Kitt Peak || Spacewatch || — || align=right data-sort-value="0.69" | 690 m || 
|-id=681 bgcolor=#d6d6d6
| 427681 ||  || — || February 15, 2004 || Catalina || CSS || — || align=right | 3.1 km || 
|-id=682 bgcolor=#d6d6d6
| 427682 ||  || — || February 12, 2004 || Kitt Peak || Spacewatch || VER || align=right | 2.6 km || 
|-id=683 bgcolor=#d6d6d6
| 427683 ||  || — || February 13, 2004 || Kitt Peak || Spacewatch || — || align=right | 2.6 km || 
|-id=684 bgcolor=#FFC2E0
| 427684 ||  || — || February 19, 2004 || Socorro || LINEAR || ATEcritical || align=right data-sort-value="0.32" | 320 m || 
|-id=685 bgcolor=#d6d6d6
| 427685 ||  || — || February 25, 2004 || Desert Eagle || W. K. Y. Yeung || — || align=right | 3.2 km || 
|-id=686 bgcolor=#fefefe
| 427686 ||  || — || February 23, 2004 || Socorro || LINEAR || — || align=right data-sort-value="0.72" | 720 m || 
|-id=687 bgcolor=#d6d6d6
| 427687 ||  || — || February 12, 2004 || Kitt Peak || Spacewatch || EOS || align=right | 2.0 km || 
|-id=688 bgcolor=#fefefe
| 427688 || 2004 ET || — || March 13, 2004 || Wrightwood || J. W. Young || NYS || align=right data-sort-value="0.64" | 640 m || 
|-id=689 bgcolor=#d6d6d6
| 427689 ||  || — || March 14, 2004 || Socorro || LINEAR || — || align=right | 3.7 km || 
|-id=690 bgcolor=#d6d6d6
| 427690 ||  || — || March 13, 2004 || Palomar || NEAT || — || align=right | 3.5 km || 
|-id=691 bgcolor=#d6d6d6
| 427691 ||  || — || March 15, 2004 || Catalina || CSS || — || align=right | 3.2 km || 
|-id=692 bgcolor=#fefefe
| 427692 ||  || — || March 15, 2004 || Kitt Peak || Spacewatch || MAS || align=right data-sort-value="0.61" | 610 m || 
|-id=693 bgcolor=#d6d6d6
| 427693 ||  || — || March 15, 2004 || Kitt Peak || Spacewatch || Tj (2.99) || align=right | 4.8 km || 
|-id=694 bgcolor=#d6d6d6
| 427694 ||  || — || February 17, 2004 || Kitt Peak || Spacewatch || — || align=right | 4.3 km || 
|-id=695 bgcolor=#d6d6d6
| 427695 Johnpazder ||  ||  || March 16, 2004 || Mauna Kea || D. D. Balam || — || align=right | 3.1 km || 
|-id=696 bgcolor=#fefefe
| 427696 ||  || — || March 26, 2004 || Goodricke-Pigott || Goodricke-Pigott Obs. || — || align=right | 2.4 km || 
|-id=697 bgcolor=#d6d6d6
| 427697 ||  || — || March 17, 2004 || Socorro || LINEAR || — || align=right | 4.2 km || 
|-id=698 bgcolor=#fefefe
| 427698 ||  || — || March 19, 2004 || Catalina || CSS || — || align=right | 1.0 km || 
|-id=699 bgcolor=#d6d6d6
| 427699 ||  || — || March 30, 2004 || Socorro || LINEAR || — || align=right | 4.0 km || 
|-id=700 bgcolor=#fefefe
| 427700 ||  || — || March 30, 2004 || Socorro || LINEAR || — || align=right | 1.3 km || 
|}

427701–427800 

|-bgcolor=#d6d6d6
| 427701 ||  || — || March 17, 2004 || Socorro || LINEAR || — || align=right | 3.4 km || 
|-id=702 bgcolor=#fefefe
| 427702 ||  || — || March 17, 2004 || Kitt Peak || Spacewatch || NYS || align=right data-sort-value="0.76" | 760 m || 
|-id=703 bgcolor=#d6d6d6
| 427703 ||  || — || March 17, 2004 || Socorro || LINEAR || — || align=right | 3.5 km || 
|-id=704 bgcolor=#d6d6d6
| 427704 ||  || — || March 19, 2004 || Socorro || LINEAR || — || align=right | 3.4 km || 
|-id=705 bgcolor=#fefefe
| 427705 ||  || — || March 20, 2004 || Socorro || LINEAR || V || align=right data-sort-value="0.92" | 920 m || 
|-id=706 bgcolor=#d6d6d6
| 427706 ||  || — || March 19, 2004 || Kitt Peak || Spacewatch || — || align=right | 2.3 km || 
|-id=707 bgcolor=#d6d6d6
| 427707 ||  || — || March 23, 2004 || Socorro || LINEAR || Tj (2.99) || align=right | 3.5 km || 
|-id=708 bgcolor=#d6d6d6
| 427708 ||  || — || March 23, 2004 || Kitt Peak || Spacewatch || — || align=right | 2.4 km || 
|-id=709 bgcolor=#fefefe
| 427709 ||  || — || March 23, 2004 || Kitt Peak || Spacewatch || MAS || align=right data-sort-value="0.61" | 610 m || 
|-id=710 bgcolor=#fefefe
| 427710 ||  || — || March 22, 2004 || Socorro || LINEAR || — || align=right data-sort-value="0.96" | 960 m || 
|-id=711 bgcolor=#d6d6d6
| 427711 ||  || — || March 27, 2004 || Kitt Peak || Spacewatch || — || align=right | 3.2 km || 
|-id=712 bgcolor=#d6d6d6
| 427712 ||  || — || March 23, 2004 || Kitt Peak || Spacewatch || — || align=right | 2.1 km || 
|-id=713 bgcolor=#fefefe
| 427713 ||  || — || March 27, 2004 || Kitt Peak || Spacewatch || H || align=right data-sort-value="0.57" | 570 m || 
|-id=714 bgcolor=#d6d6d6
| 427714 ||  || — || March 29, 2004 || Socorro || LINEAR || — || align=right | 3.7 km || 
|-id=715 bgcolor=#fefefe
| 427715 ||  || — || March 17, 2004 || Kitt Peak || Spacewatch || NYS || align=right data-sort-value="0.69" | 690 m || 
|-id=716 bgcolor=#d6d6d6
| 427716 ||  || — || April 12, 2004 || Desert Eagle || W. K. Y. Yeung || — || align=right | 2.8 km || 
|-id=717 bgcolor=#d6d6d6
| 427717 ||  || — || April 12, 2004 || Kitt Peak || Spacewatch || — || align=right | 2.7 km || 
|-id=718 bgcolor=#fefefe
| 427718 ||  || — || April 13, 2004 || Kitt Peak || Spacewatch || — || align=right data-sort-value="0.69" | 690 m || 
|-id=719 bgcolor=#d6d6d6
| 427719 ||  || — || March 23, 2004 || Kitt Peak || Spacewatch || VER || align=right | 3.2 km || 
|-id=720 bgcolor=#fefefe
| 427720 ||  || — || April 19, 2004 || Socorro || LINEAR || H || align=right data-sort-value="0.85" | 850 m || 
|-id=721 bgcolor=#fefefe
| 427721 ||  || — || March 31, 2004 || Kitt Peak || Spacewatch || — || align=right data-sort-value="0.94" | 940 m || 
|-id=722 bgcolor=#fefefe
| 427722 ||  || — || April 17, 2004 || Kitt Peak || Spacewatch || — || align=right data-sort-value="0.85" | 850 m || 
|-id=723 bgcolor=#d6d6d6
| 427723 ||  || — || April 27, 2004 || Socorro || LINEAR || — || align=right | 3.6 km || 
|-id=724 bgcolor=#d6d6d6
| 427724 ||  || — || May 13, 2004 || Socorro || LINEAR || — || align=right | 1.5 km || 
|-id=725 bgcolor=#E9E9E9
| 427725 ||  || — || July 11, 2004 || Palomar || NEAT || — || align=right | 1.1 km || 
|-id=726 bgcolor=#E9E9E9
| 427726 ||  || — || July 10, 2004 || Catalina || CSS || — || align=right | 2.3 km || 
|-id=727 bgcolor=#E9E9E9
| 427727 ||  || — || July 14, 2004 || Socorro || LINEAR || — || align=right | 2.1 km || 
|-id=728 bgcolor=#E9E9E9
| 427728 ||  || — || August 7, 2004 || Palomar || NEAT || — || align=right | 1.2 km || 
|-id=729 bgcolor=#E9E9E9
| 427729 ||  || — || August 8, 2004 || Anderson Mesa || LONEOS || — || align=right | 1.6 km || 
|-id=730 bgcolor=#E9E9E9
| 427730 ||  || — || August 10, 2004 || Anderson Mesa || LONEOS || — || align=right | 2.1 km || 
|-id=731 bgcolor=#E9E9E9
| 427731 ||  || — || July 17, 2004 || Socorro || LINEAR || — || align=right | 1.8 km || 
|-id=732 bgcolor=#E9E9E9
| 427732 ||  || — || August 10, 2004 || Anderson Mesa || LONEOS || — || align=right | 1.0 km || 
|-id=733 bgcolor=#E9E9E9
| 427733 ||  || — || July 29, 2004 || Siding Spring || SSS || (1547) || align=right | 1.9 km || 
|-id=734 bgcolor=#E9E9E9
| 427734 ||  || — || August 21, 2004 || Siding Spring || SSS || — || align=right | 1.4 km || 
|-id=735 bgcolor=#E9E9E9
| 427735 ||  || — || September 7, 2004 || Socorro || LINEAR || — || align=right | 1.8 km || 
|-id=736 bgcolor=#E9E9E9
| 427736 ||  || — || September 7, 2004 || Socorro || LINEAR || — || align=right | 2.2 km || 
|-id=737 bgcolor=#E9E9E9
| 427737 ||  || — || September 8, 2004 || Socorro || LINEAR || — || align=right | 1.1 km || 
|-id=738 bgcolor=#E9E9E9
| 427738 ||  || — || August 13, 2004 || Socorro || LINEAR || — || align=right | 2.6 km || 
|-id=739 bgcolor=#E9E9E9
| 427739 ||  || — || September 8, 2004 || Socorro || LINEAR || — || align=right | 1.6 km || 
|-id=740 bgcolor=#E9E9E9
| 427740 ||  || — || September 8, 2004 || Palomar || NEAT || — || align=right | 1.4 km || 
|-id=741 bgcolor=#E9E9E9
| 427741 ||  || — || September 8, 2004 || Socorro || LINEAR || — || align=right | 1.5 km || 
|-id=742 bgcolor=#E9E9E9
| 427742 ||  || — || August 25, 2004 || Kitt Peak || Spacewatch || EUN || align=right | 1.4 km || 
|-id=743 bgcolor=#E9E9E9
| 427743 ||  || — || August 9, 2004 || Socorro || LINEAR || — || align=right | 2.0 km || 
|-id=744 bgcolor=#E9E9E9
| 427744 ||  || — || September 7, 2004 || Kitt Peak || Spacewatch || EUN || align=right | 1.2 km || 
|-id=745 bgcolor=#E9E9E9
| 427745 ||  || — || September 7, 2004 || Kitt Peak || Spacewatch || — || align=right data-sort-value="0.97" | 970 m || 
|-id=746 bgcolor=#E9E9E9
| 427746 ||  || — || September 10, 2004 || Socorro || LINEAR || — || align=right | 1.8 km || 
|-id=747 bgcolor=#E9E9E9
| 427747 ||  || — || September 10, 2004 || Socorro || LINEAR || — || align=right | 1.8 km || 
|-id=748 bgcolor=#E9E9E9
| 427748 ||  || — || September 9, 2004 || Socorro || LINEAR || — || align=right | 1.4 km || 
|-id=749 bgcolor=#E9E9E9
| 427749 ||  || — || September 13, 2004 || Kitt Peak || Spacewatch || — || align=right | 1.4 km || 
|-id=750 bgcolor=#E9E9E9
| 427750 ||  || — || September 13, 2004 || Socorro || LINEAR || — || align=right | 1.9 km || 
|-id=751 bgcolor=#E9E9E9
| 427751 ||  || — || September 16, 2004 || Siding Spring || SSS || — || align=right | 1.3 km || 
|-id=752 bgcolor=#E9E9E9
| 427752 ||  || — || September 17, 2004 || Kitt Peak || Spacewatch || — || align=right | 1.7 km || 
|-id=753 bgcolor=#E9E9E9
| 427753 ||  || — || August 23, 2004 || Kitt Peak || Spacewatch || — || align=right data-sort-value="0.92" | 920 m || 
|-id=754 bgcolor=#E9E9E9
| 427754 ||  || — || September 17, 2004 || Socorro || LINEAR || — || align=right | 2.2 km || 
|-id=755 bgcolor=#E9E9E9
| 427755 ||  || — || September 22, 2004 || Socorro || LINEAR || — || align=right | 2.0 km || 
|-id=756 bgcolor=#fefefe
| 427756 ||  || — || October 4, 2004 || Kitt Peak || Spacewatch || — || align=right data-sort-value="0.67" | 670 m || 
|-id=757 bgcolor=#E9E9E9
| 427757 ||  || — || October 8, 2004 || Anderson Mesa || LONEOS || — || align=right | 2.7 km || 
|-id=758 bgcolor=#E9E9E9
| 427758 ||  || — || September 10, 2004 || Kitt Peak || Spacewatch || MIS || align=right | 2.3 km || 
|-id=759 bgcolor=#E9E9E9
| 427759 ||  || — || September 22, 2004 || Socorro || LINEAR || EUN || align=right | 1.2 km || 
|-id=760 bgcolor=#E9E9E9
| 427760 ||  || — || October 5, 2004 || Anderson Mesa || LONEOS || — || align=right | 1.6 km || 
|-id=761 bgcolor=#E9E9E9
| 427761 ||  || — || October 5, 2004 || Anderson Mesa || LONEOS || — || align=right | 2.7 km || 
|-id=762 bgcolor=#E9E9E9
| 427762 ||  || — || October 7, 2004 || Socorro || LINEAR || MIS || align=right | 2.9 km || 
|-id=763 bgcolor=#E9E9E9
| 427763 ||  || — || October 9, 2004 || Anderson Mesa || LONEOS || — || align=right | 2.1 km || 
|-id=764 bgcolor=#E9E9E9
| 427764 ||  || — || October 6, 2004 || Kitt Peak || Spacewatch || — || align=right | 1.3 km || 
|-id=765 bgcolor=#E9E9E9
| 427765 ||  || — || October 6, 2004 || Kitt Peak || Spacewatch || — || align=right | 1.7 km || 
|-id=766 bgcolor=#E9E9E9
| 427766 ||  || — || September 10, 2004 || Kitt Peak || Spacewatch || WIT || align=right | 1.2 km || 
|-id=767 bgcolor=#E9E9E9
| 427767 ||  || — || October 7, 2004 || Kitt Peak || Spacewatch || — || align=right | 1.6 km || 
|-id=768 bgcolor=#E9E9E9
| 427768 ||  || — || October 7, 2004 || Kitt Peak || Spacewatch || — || align=right | 2.8 km || 
|-id=769 bgcolor=#E9E9E9
| 427769 ||  || — || October 9, 2004 || Palomar || NEAT || — || align=right | 2.6 km || 
|-id=770 bgcolor=#E9E9E9
| 427770 ||  || — || October 9, 2004 || Kitt Peak || Spacewatch || HOF || align=right | 2.6 km || 
|-id=771 bgcolor=#d6d6d6
| 427771 ||  || — || November 4, 2004 || Needville || J. Dellinger, P. Garossino || — || align=right | 2.9 km || 
|-id=772 bgcolor=#E9E9E9
| 427772 ||  || — || November 4, 2004 || Kitt Peak || Spacewatch ||  || align=right | 3.6 km || 
|-id=773 bgcolor=#E9E9E9
| 427773 ||  || — || November 9, 2004 || Mauna Kea || C. Veillet || — || align=right | 1.3 km || 
|-id=774 bgcolor=#E9E9E9
| 427774 ||  || — || November 10, 2004 || Kitt Peak || Spacewatch || — || align=right | 2.1 km || 
|-id=775 bgcolor=#E9E9E9
| 427775 ||  || — || December 14, 2004 || Socorro || LINEAR || — || align=right | 2.8 km || 
|-id=776 bgcolor=#d6d6d6
| 427776 ||  || — || December 21, 2004 || Catalina || CSS || — || align=right | 4.0 km || 
|-id=777 bgcolor=#E9E9E9
| 427777 ||  || — || January 6, 2005 || Socorro || LINEAR || — || align=right | 3.2 km || 
|-id=778 bgcolor=#FFC2E0
| 427778 ||  || — || January 16, 2005 || Catalina || CSS || ATE || align=right data-sort-value="0.34" | 340 m || 
|-id=779 bgcolor=#fefefe
| 427779 ||  || — || January 16, 2005 || Kitt Peak || Spacewatch || — || align=right data-sort-value="0.74" | 740 m || 
|-id=780 bgcolor=#fefefe
| 427780 ||  || — || February 1, 2005 || Kitt Peak || Spacewatch || H || align=right data-sort-value="0.74" | 740 m || 
|-id=781 bgcolor=#d6d6d6
| 427781 ||  || — || February 1, 2005 || Kitt Peak || Spacewatch || — || align=right | 1.7 km || 
|-id=782 bgcolor=#fefefe
| 427782 ||  || — || January 19, 2005 || Kitt Peak || Spacewatch || (2076) || align=right data-sort-value="0.78" | 780 m || 
|-id=783 bgcolor=#fefefe
| 427783 ||  || — || March 4, 2005 || Kitt Peak || Spacewatch || — || align=right | 1.1 km || 
|-id=784 bgcolor=#fefefe
| 427784 ||  || — || March 4, 2005 || Kitt Peak || Spacewatch || — || align=right data-sort-value="0.68" | 680 m || 
|-id=785 bgcolor=#fefefe
| 427785 ||  || — || March 4, 2005 || Kitt Peak || Spacewatch || — || align=right data-sort-value="0.72" | 720 m || 
|-id=786 bgcolor=#fefefe
| 427786 ||  || — || March 8, 2005 || Socorro || LINEAR || — || align=right data-sort-value="0.93" | 930 m || 
|-id=787 bgcolor=#fefefe
| 427787 ||  || — || March 10, 2005 || Mount Lemmon || Mount Lemmon Survey || — || align=right data-sort-value="0.71" | 710 m || 
|-id=788 bgcolor=#fefefe
| 427788 ||  || — || March 4, 2005 || Kitt Peak || Spacewatch || — || align=right data-sort-value="0.78" | 780 m || 
|-id=789 bgcolor=#fefefe
| 427789 ||  || — || March 9, 2005 || Socorro || LINEAR || — || align=right data-sort-value="0.71" | 710 m || 
|-id=790 bgcolor=#d6d6d6
| 427790 ||  || — || March 11, 2005 || Kitt Peak || Spacewatch || — || align=right | 2.1 km || 
|-id=791 bgcolor=#fefefe
| 427791 ||  || — || March 12, 2005 || Kitt Peak || Spacewatch || — || align=right data-sort-value="0.63" | 630 m || 
|-id=792 bgcolor=#d6d6d6
| 427792 ||  || — || March 13, 2005 || Catalina || CSS || — || align=right | 3.4 km || 
|-id=793 bgcolor=#d6d6d6
| 427793 ||  || — || March 11, 2005 || Kitt Peak || Spacewatch || EOS || align=right | 2.0 km || 
|-id=794 bgcolor=#d6d6d6
| 427794 ||  || — || March 12, 2005 || Kitt Peak || Spacewatch || EOS || align=right | 2.3 km || 
|-id=795 bgcolor=#fefefe
| 427795 ||  || — || March 16, 2005 || Catalina || CSS || H || align=right data-sort-value="0.74" | 740 m || 
|-id=796 bgcolor=#fefefe
| 427796 ||  || — || April 1, 2005 || Kitt Peak || Spacewatch || — || align=right data-sort-value="0.62" | 620 m || 
|-id=797 bgcolor=#d6d6d6
| 427797 ||  || — || April 5, 2005 || Mount Lemmon || Mount Lemmon Survey || — || align=right | 2.3 km || 
|-id=798 bgcolor=#d6d6d6
| 427798 ||  || — || April 6, 2005 || Mount Lemmon || Mount Lemmon Survey || — || align=right | 2.5 km || 
|-id=799 bgcolor=#d6d6d6
| 427799 ||  || — || April 2, 2005 || Catalina || CSS || — || align=right | 4.7 km || 
|-id=800 bgcolor=#d6d6d6
| 427800 ||  || — || April 5, 2005 || Catalina || CSS || — || align=right | 3.0 km || 
|}

427801–427900 

|-bgcolor=#d6d6d6
| 427801 ||  || — || April 5, 2005 || Mount Lemmon || Mount Lemmon Survey || — || align=right | 2.0 km || 
|-id=802 bgcolor=#d6d6d6
| 427802 ||  || — || April 9, 2005 || Socorro || LINEAR || — || align=right | 3.2 km || 
|-id=803 bgcolor=#fefefe
| 427803 ||  || — || April 10, 2005 || Mount Lemmon || Mount Lemmon Survey || — || align=right data-sort-value="0.59" | 590 m || 
|-id=804 bgcolor=#d6d6d6
| 427804 ||  || — || April 8, 2005 || Socorro || LINEAR || — || align=right | 2.5 km || 
|-id=805 bgcolor=#d6d6d6
| 427805 ||  || — || April 11, 2005 || Kitt Peak || Spacewatch || EOS || align=right | 1.8 km || 
|-id=806 bgcolor=#d6d6d6
| 427806 ||  || — || April 12, 2005 || Anderson Mesa || LONEOS || — || align=right | 3.6 km || 
|-id=807 bgcolor=#fefefe
| 427807 ||  || — || April 7, 2005 || Kitt Peak || Spacewatch || — || align=right data-sort-value="0.66" | 660 m || 
|-id=808 bgcolor=#fefefe
| 427808 ||  || — || April 10, 2005 || Kitt Peak || Spacewatch || — || align=right data-sort-value="0.81" | 810 m || 
|-id=809 bgcolor=#d6d6d6
| 427809 ||  || — || April 12, 2005 || Kitt Peak || Spacewatch || — || align=right | 2.9 km || 
|-id=810 bgcolor=#d6d6d6
| 427810 ||  || — || March 10, 2005 || Mount Lemmon || Mount Lemmon Survey || — || align=right | 2.8 km || 
|-id=811 bgcolor=#d6d6d6
| 427811 ||  || — || April 2, 2005 || Catalina || CSS || — || align=right | 3.9 km || 
|-id=812 bgcolor=#d6d6d6
| 427812 ||  || — || April 1, 2005 || Catalina || CSS || Tj (2.98) || align=right | 4.5 km || 
|-id=813 bgcolor=#FA8072
| 427813 ||  || — || April 7, 2005 || Catalina || CSS || H || align=right data-sort-value="0.94" | 940 m || 
|-id=814 bgcolor=#d6d6d6
| 427814 ||  || — || April 12, 2005 || Kitt Peak || M. W. Buie || — || align=right | 4.3 km || 
|-id=815 bgcolor=#fefefe
| 427815 ||  || — || April 13, 2005 || Socorro || LINEAR || — || align=right data-sort-value="0.67" | 670 m || 
|-id=816 bgcolor=#d6d6d6
| 427816 ||  || — || April 6, 2005 || Mount Lemmon || Mount Lemmon Survey || — || align=right | 2.6 km || 
|-id=817 bgcolor=#fefefe
| 427817 ||  || — || April 30, 2005 || Kitt Peak || Spacewatch || — || align=right data-sort-value="0.74" | 740 m || 
|-id=818 bgcolor=#d6d6d6
| 427818 ||  || — || April 30, 2005 || Kitt Peak || Spacewatch || — || align=right | 3.0 km || 
|-id=819 bgcolor=#fefefe
| 427819 ||  || — || May 4, 2005 || Catalina || CSS || — || align=right data-sort-value="0.89" | 890 m || 
|-id=820 bgcolor=#fefefe
| 427820 ||  || — || May 3, 2005 || Kitt Peak || Spacewatch || — || align=right data-sort-value="0.64" | 640 m || 
|-id=821 bgcolor=#fefefe
| 427821 ||  || — || May 4, 2005 || Kitt Peak || Spacewatch || — || align=right data-sort-value="0.79" | 790 m || 
|-id=822 bgcolor=#d6d6d6
| 427822 ||  || — || May 4, 2005 || Palomar || NEAT || — || align=right | 4.3 km || 
|-id=823 bgcolor=#d6d6d6
| 427823 ||  || — || May 7, 2005 || Kitt Peak || Spacewatch || — || align=right | 3.3 km || 
|-id=824 bgcolor=#fefefe
| 427824 ||  || — || April 30, 2005 || Kitt Peak || Spacewatch || — || align=right data-sort-value="0.59" | 590 m || 
|-id=825 bgcolor=#d6d6d6
| 427825 ||  || — || April 30, 2005 || Kitt Peak || Spacewatch || — || align=right | 3.3 km || 
|-id=826 bgcolor=#d6d6d6
| 427826 ||  || — || May 10, 2005 || Kitt Peak || Spacewatch || — || align=right | 4.7 km || 
|-id=827 bgcolor=#d6d6d6
| 427827 ||  || — || May 6, 2005 || Anderson Mesa || LONEOS || — || align=right | 4.9 km || 
|-id=828 bgcolor=#d6d6d6
| 427828 ||  || — || January 1, 1998 || Kitt Peak || Spacewatch || — || align=right | 4.8 km || 
|-id=829 bgcolor=#d6d6d6
| 427829 ||  || — || May 9, 2005 || Kitt Peak || Spacewatch || — || align=right | 2.8 km || 
|-id=830 bgcolor=#d6d6d6
| 427830 ||  || — || May 12, 2005 || Socorro || LINEAR || — || align=right | 1.9 km || 
|-id=831 bgcolor=#d6d6d6
| 427831 ||  || — || May 4, 2005 || Kitt Peak || DLS || Tj (2.99) || align=right | 3.2 km || 
|-id=832 bgcolor=#fefefe
| 427832 ||  || — || May 9, 2005 || Kitt Peak || Spacewatch || V || align=right data-sort-value="0.74" | 740 m || 
|-id=833 bgcolor=#d6d6d6
| 427833 ||  || — || May 9, 2005 || Catalina || CSS || LIX || align=right | 4.2 km || 
|-id=834 bgcolor=#d6d6d6
| 427834 ||  || — || May 10, 2005 || Kitt Peak || Spacewatch || — || align=right | 3.4 km || 
|-id=835 bgcolor=#fefefe
| 427835 ||  || — || May 10, 2005 || Kitt Peak || Spacewatch || — || align=right data-sort-value="0.59" | 590 m || 
|-id=836 bgcolor=#d6d6d6
| 427836 ||  || — || May 11, 2005 || Kitt Peak || Spacewatch || — || align=right | 3.1 km || 
|-id=837 bgcolor=#fefefe
| 427837 ||  || — || May 3, 2005 || Kitt Peak || Spacewatch || — || align=right data-sort-value="0.81" | 810 m || 
|-id=838 bgcolor=#fefefe
| 427838 ||  || — || May 14, 2005 || Socorro || LINEAR || H || align=right data-sort-value="0.95" | 950 m || 
|-id=839 bgcolor=#d6d6d6
| 427839 ||  || — || May 4, 2005 || Kitt Peak || Spacewatch || — || align=right | 2.8 km || 
|-id=840 bgcolor=#d6d6d6
| 427840 ||  || — || June 1, 2005 || Kitt Peak || Spacewatch || — || align=right | 3.1 km || 
|-id=841 bgcolor=#d6d6d6
| 427841 ||  || — || May 19, 2005 || Mount Lemmon || Mount Lemmon Survey || EOS || align=right | 1.6 km || 
|-id=842 bgcolor=#d6d6d6
| 427842 ||  || — || June 3, 2005 || Kitt Peak || Spacewatch || — || align=right | 4.6 km || 
|-id=843 bgcolor=#fefefe
| 427843 ||  || — || June 8, 2005 || Kitt Peak || Spacewatch || — || align=right data-sort-value="0.65" | 650 m || 
|-id=844 bgcolor=#fefefe
| 427844 ||  || — || May 16, 2005 || Mount Lemmon || Mount Lemmon Survey || V || align=right data-sort-value="0.56" | 560 m || 
|-id=845 bgcolor=#d6d6d6
| 427845 ||  || — || June 15, 2005 || Mount Lemmon || Mount Lemmon Survey || — || align=right | 4.4 km || 
|-id=846 bgcolor=#d6d6d6
| 427846 ||  || — || June 28, 2005 || Palomar || NEAT || — || align=right | 3.6 km || 
|-id=847 bgcolor=#fefefe
| 427847 ||  || — || June 27, 2005 || Kitt Peak || Spacewatch || — || align=right data-sort-value="0.69" | 690 m || 
|-id=848 bgcolor=#fefefe
| 427848 ||  || — || June 27, 2005 || Kitt Peak || Spacewatch || — || align=right data-sort-value="0.80" | 800 m || 
|-id=849 bgcolor=#d6d6d6
| 427849 ||  || — || June 29, 2005 || Kitt Peak || Spacewatch || — || align=right | 4.1 km || 
|-id=850 bgcolor=#d6d6d6
| 427850 ||  || — || June 29, 2005 || Kitt Peak || Spacewatch || — || align=right | 4.4 km || 
|-id=851 bgcolor=#d6d6d6
| 427851 ||  || — || June 30, 2005 || Kitt Peak || Spacewatch || — || align=right | 3.9 km || 
|-id=852 bgcolor=#fefefe
| 427852 ||  || — || June 30, 2005 || Kitt Peak || Spacewatch || — || align=right data-sort-value="0.71" | 710 m || 
|-id=853 bgcolor=#fefefe
| 427853 ||  || — || June 30, 2005 || Palomar || NEAT || — || align=right | 1.1 km || 
|-id=854 bgcolor=#fefefe
| 427854 ||  || — || July 7, 2005 || Kitt Peak || Spacewatch || — || align=right data-sort-value="0.77" | 770 m || 
|-id=855 bgcolor=#d6d6d6
| 427855 ||  || — || July 3, 2005 || Apache Point || Apache Point Obs. || — || align=right | 3.1 km || 
|-id=856 bgcolor=#fefefe
| 427856 ||  || — || July 3, 2005 || Mount Lemmon || Mount Lemmon Survey || — || align=right data-sort-value="0.87" | 870 m || 
|-id=857 bgcolor=#fefefe
| 427857 ||  || — || July 10, 2005 || Kitt Peak || Spacewatch || — || align=right data-sort-value="0.90" | 900 m || 
|-id=858 bgcolor=#fefefe
| 427858 ||  || — || June 14, 2005 || Mount Lemmon || Mount Lemmon Survey || NYS || align=right data-sort-value="0.58" | 580 m || 
|-id=859 bgcolor=#fefefe
| 427859 ||  || — || July 7, 2005 || Mauna Kea || C. Veillet || V || align=right data-sort-value="0.58" | 580 m || 
|-id=860 bgcolor=#fefefe
| 427860 ||  || — || July 30, 2005 || Palomar || NEAT || — || align=right data-sort-value="0.93" | 930 m || 
|-id=861 bgcolor=#FA8072
| 427861 ||  || — || July 25, 2005 || Siding Spring || SSS || — || align=right data-sort-value="0.88" | 880 m || 
|-id=862 bgcolor=#fefefe
| 427862 ||  || — || August 7, 2005 || Siding Spring || SSS || — || align=right | 1.3 km || 
|-id=863 bgcolor=#fefefe
| 427863 ||  || — || August 4, 2005 || Palomar || NEAT || MAS || align=right data-sort-value="0.66" | 660 m || 
|-id=864 bgcolor=#fefefe
| 427864 ||  || — || August 25, 2005 || Campo Imperatore || CINEOS || H || align=right data-sort-value="0.56" | 560 m || 
|-id=865 bgcolor=#fefefe
| 427865 ||  || — || August 27, 2005 || Kitt Peak || Spacewatch || — || align=right data-sort-value="0.81" | 810 m || 
|-id=866 bgcolor=#fefefe
| 427866 ||  || — || August 25, 2005 || Palomar || NEAT || ERI || align=right | 1.6 km || 
|-id=867 bgcolor=#fefefe
| 427867 ||  || — || August 25, 2005 || Palomar || NEAT || — || align=right data-sort-value="0.81" | 810 m || 
|-id=868 bgcolor=#fefefe
| 427868 ||  || — || August 27, 2005 || Palomar || NEAT || — || align=right data-sort-value="0.84" | 840 m || 
|-id=869 bgcolor=#d6d6d6
| 427869 ||  || — || August 27, 2005 || Palomar || NEAT || — || align=right | 3.2 km || 
|-id=870 bgcolor=#fefefe
| 427870 ||  || — || August 28, 2005 || Kitt Peak || Spacewatch || — || align=right data-sort-value="0.84" | 840 m || 
|-id=871 bgcolor=#E9E9E9
| 427871 ||  || — || September 10, 2005 || Anderson Mesa || LONEOS || — || align=right | 2.1 km || 
|-id=872 bgcolor=#fefefe
| 427872 ||  || — || September 23, 2005 || Catalina || CSS || — || align=right | 1.0 km || 
|-id=873 bgcolor=#E9E9E9
| 427873 ||  || — || September 23, 2005 || Kitt Peak || Spacewatch || RAF || align=right data-sort-value="0.89" | 890 m || 
|-id=874 bgcolor=#E9E9E9
| 427874 ||  || — || September 23, 2005 || Kitt Peak || Spacewatch || — || align=right data-sort-value="0.93" | 930 m || 
|-id=875 bgcolor=#fefefe
| 427875 ||  || — || September 26, 2005 || Kitt Peak || Spacewatch || — || align=right | 1.1 km || 
|-id=876 bgcolor=#E9E9E9
| 427876 ||  || — || September 24, 2005 || Kitt Peak || Spacewatch || — || align=right data-sort-value="0.65" | 650 m || 
|-id=877 bgcolor=#E9E9E9
| 427877 ||  || — || September 25, 2005 || Kitt Peak || Spacewatch || — || align=right | 1.1 km || 
|-id=878 bgcolor=#fefefe
| 427878 ||  || — || September 27, 2005 || Kitt Peak || Spacewatch || MAS || align=right data-sort-value="0.64" | 640 m || 
|-id=879 bgcolor=#E9E9E9
| 427879 ||  || — || September 25, 2005 || Kitt Peak || Spacewatch || — || align=right data-sort-value="0.72" | 720 m || 
|-id=880 bgcolor=#fefefe
| 427880 ||  || — || September 25, 2005 || Kitt Peak || Spacewatch || MAS || align=right data-sort-value="0.72" | 720 m || 
|-id=881 bgcolor=#fefefe
| 427881 ||  || — || September 25, 2005 || Kitt Peak || Spacewatch || — || align=right data-sort-value="0.89" | 890 m || 
|-id=882 bgcolor=#E9E9E9
| 427882 ||  || — || September 26, 2005 || Kitt Peak || Spacewatch || — || align=right data-sort-value="0.69" | 690 m || 
|-id=883 bgcolor=#E9E9E9
| 427883 ||  || — || September 29, 2005 || Kitt Peak || Spacewatch || — || align=right data-sort-value="0.86" | 860 m || 
|-id=884 bgcolor=#fefefe
| 427884 ||  || — || September 29, 2005 || Mount Lemmon || Mount Lemmon Survey || — || align=right data-sort-value="0.71" | 710 m || 
|-id=885 bgcolor=#FA8072
| 427885 ||  || — || September 30, 2005 || Palomar || NEAT || — || align=right | 1.4 km || 
|-id=886 bgcolor=#fefefe
| 427886 ||  || — || September 29, 2005 || Kitt Peak || Spacewatch || — || align=right data-sort-value="0.85" | 850 m || 
|-id=887 bgcolor=#E9E9E9
| 427887 ||  || — || September 28, 2005 || Palomar || NEAT || — || align=right data-sort-value="0.89" | 890 m || 
|-id=888 bgcolor=#E9E9E9
| 427888 ||  || — || September 30, 2005 || Catalina || CSS || — || align=right | 1.5 km || 
|-id=889 bgcolor=#fefefe
| 427889 ||  || — || October 1, 2005 || Anderson Mesa || LONEOS || — || align=right | 1.4 km || 
|-id=890 bgcolor=#fefefe
| 427890 ||  || — || October 1, 2005 || Catalina || CSS || H || align=right data-sort-value="0.90" | 900 m || 
|-id=891 bgcolor=#E9E9E9
| 427891 ||  || — || October 1, 2005 || Kitt Peak || Spacewatch || — || align=right data-sort-value="0.73" | 730 m || 
|-id=892 bgcolor=#E9E9E9
| 427892 ||  || — || October 6, 2005 || Catalina || CSS || EUN || align=right | 1.3 km || 
|-id=893 bgcolor=#E9E9E9
| 427893 ||  || — || October 2, 2005 || Mount Lemmon || Mount Lemmon Survey || — || align=right data-sort-value="0.82" | 820 m || 
|-id=894 bgcolor=#E9E9E9
| 427894 ||  || — || October 22, 2005 || Goodricke-Pigott || R. A. Tucker || — || align=right | 1.2 km || 
|-id=895 bgcolor=#E9E9E9
| 427895 ||  || — || October 22, 2005 || Catalina || CSS || — || align=right | 1.6 km || 
|-id=896 bgcolor=#d6d6d6
| 427896 ||  || — || October 24, 2005 || Kitt Peak || Spacewatch || 3:2 || align=right | 3.1 km || 
|-id=897 bgcolor=#E9E9E9
| 427897 ||  || — || October 24, 2005 || Kitt Peak || Spacewatch || — || align=right | 1.5 km || 
|-id=898 bgcolor=#E9E9E9
| 427898 ||  || — || October 22, 2005 || Kitt Peak || Spacewatch || — || align=right | 1.0 km || 
|-id=899 bgcolor=#E9E9E9
| 427899 ||  || — || October 22, 2005 || Kitt Peak || Spacewatch || — || align=right | 1.7 km || 
|-id=900 bgcolor=#E9E9E9
| 427900 ||  || — || October 22, 2005 || Kitt Peak || Spacewatch || — || align=right | 1.3 km || 
|}

427901–428000 

|-bgcolor=#E9E9E9
| 427901 ||  || — || October 22, 2005 || Kitt Peak || Spacewatch || — || align=right data-sort-value="0.65" | 650 m || 
|-id=902 bgcolor=#d6d6d6
| 427902 ||  || — || October 24, 2005 || Kitt Peak || Spacewatch || SHU3:2 || align=right | 4.9 km || 
|-id=903 bgcolor=#E9E9E9
| 427903 ||  || — || October 24, 2005 || Palomar || NEAT || — || align=right data-sort-value="0.88" | 880 m || 
|-id=904 bgcolor=#E9E9E9
| 427904 ||  || — || October 26, 2005 || Kitt Peak || Spacewatch || — || align=right data-sort-value="0.84" | 840 m || 
|-id=905 bgcolor=#E9E9E9
| 427905 ||  || — || October 24, 2005 || Kitt Peak || Spacewatch || — || align=right | 1.4 km || 
|-id=906 bgcolor=#E9E9E9
| 427906 ||  || — || October 26, 2005 || Kitt Peak || Spacewatch || — || align=right | 1.1 km || 
|-id=907 bgcolor=#E9E9E9
| 427907 ||  || — || October 25, 2005 || Kitt Peak || Spacewatch || — || align=right | 1.1 km || 
|-id=908 bgcolor=#E9E9E9
| 427908 ||  || — || October 25, 2005 || Kitt Peak || Spacewatch || — || align=right data-sort-value="0.74" | 740 m || 
|-id=909 bgcolor=#E9E9E9
| 427909 ||  || — || October 25, 2005 || Kitt Peak || Spacewatch || (5) || align=right data-sort-value="0.80" | 800 m || 
|-id=910 bgcolor=#E9E9E9
| 427910 ||  || — || October 25, 2005 || Kitt Peak || Spacewatch || — || align=right | 2.4 km || 
|-id=911 bgcolor=#E9E9E9
| 427911 ||  || — || October 27, 2005 || Kitt Peak || Spacewatch || — || align=right data-sort-value="0.94" | 940 m || 
|-id=912 bgcolor=#E9E9E9
| 427912 ||  || — || October 24, 2005 || Kitt Peak || Spacewatch || — || align=right | 1.2 km || 
|-id=913 bgcolor=#E9E9E9
| 427913 ||  || — || October 26, 2005 || Kitt Peak || Spacewatch || — || align=right | 1.8 km || 
|-id=914 bgcolor=#FA8072
| 427914 ||  || — || September 3, 2005 || Catalina || CSS || — || align=right data-sort-value="0.87" | 870 m || 
|-id=915 bgcolor=#E9E9E9
| 427915 ||  || — || October 29, 2005 || Catalina || CSS || EUN || align=right | 1.3 km || 
|-id=916 bgcolor=#E9E9E9
| 427916 ||  || — || October 29, 2005 || Mount Lemmon || Mount Lemmon Survey || (5) || align=right data-sort-value="0.81" | 810 m || 
|-id=917 bgcolor=#E9E9E9
| 427917 ||  || — || October 27, 2005 || Kitt Peak || Spacewatch || (5) || align=right data-sort-value="0.65" | 650 m || 
|-id=918 bgcolor=#fefefe
| 427918 ||  || — || October 30, 2005 || Mount Lemmon || Mount Lemmon Survey || NYS || align=right data-sort-value="0.68" | 680 m || 
|-id=919 bgcolor=#E9E9E9
| 427919 ||  || — || October 28, 2005 || Socorro || LINEAR || — || align=right | 1.2 km || 
|-id=920 bgcolor=#d6d6d6
| 427920 ||  || — || October 30, 2005 || Catalina || CSS || — || align=right | 3.5 km || 
|-id=921 bgcolor=#d6d6d6
| 427921 ||  || — || October 30, 2005 || Kitt Peak || Spacewatch || SHU3:2 || align=right | 4.4 km || 
|-id=922 bgcolor=#E9E9E9
| 427922 ||  || — || October 27, 2005 || Catalina || CSS || — || align=right | 1.6 km || 
|-id=923 bgcolor=#E9E9E9
| 427923 ||  || — || October 27, 2005 || Anderson Mesa || LONEOS || (5) || align=right data-sort-value="0.81" | 810 m || 
|-id=924 bgcolor=#d6d6d6
| 427924 ||  || — || October 27, 2005 || Apache Point || A. C. Becker || 3:2 || align=right | 3.4 km || 
|-id=925 bgcolor=#fefefe
| 427925 ||  || — || October 27, 2005 || Apache Point || A. C. Becker || — || align=right data-sort-value="0.72" | 720 m || 
|-id=926 bgcolor=#E9E9E9
| 427926 ||  || — || October 24, 2005 || Kitt Peak || Spacewatch || — || align=right | 1.2 km || 
|-id=927 bgcolor=#E9E9E9
| 427927 ||  || — || October 27, 2005 || Kitt Peak || Spacewatch || — || align=right | 1.0 km || 
|-id=928 bgcolor=#E9E9E9
| 427928 ||  || — || November 4, 2005 || Wrightwood || J. W. Young || JUN || align=right | 1.2 km || 
|-id=929 bgcolor=#E9E9E9
| 427929 ||  || — || November 1, 2005 || Anderson Mesa || LONEOS || — || align=right | 2.1 km || 
|-id=930 bgcolor=#E9E9E9
| 427930 ||  || — || November 3, 2005 || Mount Lemmon || Mount Lemmon Survey || — || align=right data-sort-value="0.70" | 700 m || 
|-id=931 bgcolor=#E9E9E9
| 427931 ||  || — || November 4, 2005 || Kitt Peak || Spacewatch || — || align=right data-sort-value="0.79" | 790 m || 
|-id=932 bgcolor=#E9E9E9
| 427932 ||  || — || November 2, 2005 || Mount Lemmon || Mount Lemmon Survey || — || align=right data-sort-value="0.83" | 830 m || 
|-id=933 bgcolor=#E9E9E9
| 427933 ||  || — || November 1, 2005 || Mount Lemmon || Mount Lemmon Survey || (5) || align=right data-sort-value="0.82" | 820 m || 
|-id=934 bgcolor=#E9E9E9
| 427934 ||  || — || November 1, 2005 || Mount Lemmon || Mount Lemmon Survey || — || align=right data-sort-value="0.83" | 830 m || 
|-id=935 bgcolor=#E9E9E9
| 427935 ||  || — || November 1, 2005 || Mount Lemmon || Mount Lemmon Survey || (5) || align=right data-sort-value="0.70" | 700 m || 
|-id=936 bgcolor=#E9E9E9
| 427936 ||  || — || November 6, 2005 || Mount Lemmon || Mount Lemmon Survey || — || align=right | 2.4 km || 
|-id=937 bgcolor=#E9E9E9
| 427937 ||  || — || November 5, 2005 || Kitt Peak || Spacewatch || — || align=right data-sort-value="0.99" | 990 m || 
|-id=938 bgcolor=#d6d6d6
| 427938 ||  || — || November 2, 2005 || Apache Point || A. C. Becker || SYL7:4 || align=right | 3.7 km || 
|-id=939 bgcolor=#E9E9E9
| 427939 ||  || — || November 19, 2005 || Wrightwood || J. W. Young || — || align=right | 2.0 km || 
|-id=940 bgcolor=#E9E9E9
| 427940 ||  || — || October 28, 2005 || Kitt Peak || Spacewatch || JUN || align=right data-sort-value="0.77" | 770 m || 
|-id=941 bgcolor=#E9E9E9
| 427941 ||  || — || November 22, 2005 || Catalina || CSS || — || align=right | 1.00 km || 
|-id=942 bgcolor=#E9E9E9
| 427942 ||  || — || November 25, 2005 || Kitt Peak || Spacewatch || — || align=right | 1.6 km || 
|-id=943 bgcolor=#E9E9E9
| 427943 ||  || — || November 28, 2005 || Mount Lemmon || Mount Lemmon Survey || — || align=right | 1.1 km || 
|-id=944 bgcolor=#d6d6d6
| 427944 ||  || — || October 27, 2005 || Mount Lemmon || Mount Lemmon Survey || 3:2 || align=right | 3.7 km || 
|-id=945 bgcolor=#E9E9E9
| 427945 ||  || — || November 26, 2005 || Mount Lemmon || Mount Lemmon Survey || — || align=right | 2.0 km || 
|-id=946 bgcolor=#E9E9E9
| 427946 ||  || — || November 29, 2005 || Mount Lemmon || Mount Lemmon Survey || (5) || align=right data-sort-value="0.68" | 680 m || 
|-id=947 bgcolor=#fefefe
| 427947 ||  || — || November 25, 2005 || Kitt Peak || Spacewatch || — || align=right data-sort-value="0.89" | 890 m || 
|-id=948 bgcolor=#E9E9E9
| 427948 ||  || — || November 30, 2005 || Kitt Peak || Spacewatch || — || align=right | 3.0 km || 
|-id=949 bgcolor=#E9E9E9
| 427949 ||  || — || November 30, 2005 || Kitt Peak || Spacewatch || — || align=right data-sort-value="0.80" | 800 m || 
|-id=950 bgcolor=#E9E9E9
| 427950 ||  || — || November 30, 2005 || Kitt Peak || Spacewatch || — || align=right | 1.6 km || 
|-id=951 bgcolor=#E9E9E9
| 427951 ||  || — || November 28, 2005 || Socorro || LINEAR || — || align=right | 1.1 km || 
|-id=952 bgcolor=#d6d6d6
| 427952 ||  || — || November 25, 2005 || Kitt Peak || Spacewatch || 3:2critical || align=right | 3.5 km || 
|-id=953 bgcolor=#fefefe
| 427953 ||  || — || December 2, 2005 || Kitt Peak || Spacewatch || — || align=right | 1.1 km || 
|-id=954 bgcolor=#E9E9E9
| 427954 ||  || — || December 2, 2005 || Kitt Peak || Spacewatch || (5) || align=right data-sort-value="0.78" | 780 m || 
|-id=955 bgcolor=#E9E9E9
| 427955 ||  || — || December 2, 2005 || Kitt Peak || Spacewatch || — || align=right | 1.3 km || 
|-id=956 bgcolor=#E9E9E9
| 427956 ||  || — || December 2, 2005 || Kitt Peak || Spacewatch || — || align=right | 1.5 km || 
|-id=957 bgcolor=#E9E9E9
| 427957 ||  || — || December 5, 2005 || Kitt Peak || Spacewatch || — || align=right | 1.1 km || 
|-id=958 bgcolor=#E9E9E9
| 427958 ||  || — || November 25, 2005 || Kitt Peak || Spacewatch || — || align=right | 1.0 km || 
|-id=959 bgcolor=#E9E9E9
| 427959 ||  || — || December 2, 2005 || Kitt Peak || Spacewatch || — || align=right | 1.3 km || 
|-id=960 bgcolor=#E9E9E9
| 427960 ||  || — || December 25, 2005 || Mount Lemmon || Mount Lemmon Survey || — || align=right | 1.7 km || 
|-id=961 bgcolor=#E9E9E9
| 427961 ||  || — || December 25, 2005 || Kitt Peak || Spacewatch || — || align=right | 1.4 km || 
|-id=962 bgcolor=#E9E9E9
| 427962 ||  || — || November 28, 2005 || Kitt Peak || Spacewatch || — || align=right | 1.4 km || 
|-id=963 bgcolor=#E9E9E9
| 427963 ||  || — || December 25, 2005 || Kitt Peak || Spacewatch || ADE || align=right | 2.2 km || 
|-id=964 bgcolor=#E9E9E9
| 427964 ||  || — || December 25, 2005 || Kitt Peak || Spacewatch || EUN || align=right | 1.3 km || 
|-id=965 bgcolor=#E9E9E9
| 427965 ||  || — || December 8, 2005 || Kitt Peak || Spacewatch || — || align=right | 1.6 km || 
|-id=966 bgcolor=#E9E9E9
| 427966 ||  || — || December 24, 2005 || Kitt Peak || Spacewatch || — || align=right | 1.6 km || 
|-id=967 bgcolor=#d6d6d6
| 427967 ||  || — || December 2, 2005 || Mount Lemmon || Mount Lemmon Survey || 3:2 || align=right | 4.6 km || 
|-id=968 bgcolor=#E9E9E9
| 427968 ||  || — || December 25, 2005 || Kitt Peak || Spacewatch || EUN || align=right | 1.5 km || 
|-id=969 bgcolor=#E9E9E9
| 427969 ||  || — || December 25, 2005 || Kitt Peak || Spacewatch || — || align=right | 1.1 km || 
|-id=970 bgcolor=#E9E9E9
| 427970 ||  || — || December 25, 2005 || Kitt Peak || Spacewatch || — || align=right data-sort-value="0.99" | 990 m || 
|-id=971 bgcolor=#E9E9E9
| 427971 ||  || — || December 26, 2005 || Kitt Peak || Spacewatch || — || align=right | 1.3 km || 
|-id=972 bgcolor=#E9E9E9
| 427972 ||  || — || December 28, 2005 || Mount Lemmon || Mount Lemmon Survey || — || align=right | 1.3 km || 
|-id=973 bgcolor=#E9E9E9
| 427973 ||  || — || December 28, 2005 || Mount Lemmon || Mount Lemmon Survey || — || align=right | 2.2 km || 
|-id=974 bgcolor=#E9E9E9
| 427974 ||  || — || December 27, 2005 || Kitt Peak || Spacewatch || JUN || align=right | 1.1 km || 
|-id=975 bgcolor=#E9E9E9
| 427975 ||  || — || December 10, 2005 || Catalina || CSS || BRG || align=right | 1.8 km || 
|-id=976 bgcolor=#E9E9E9
| 427976 ||  || — || December 22, 2005 || Catalina || CSS || (1547) || align=right | 1.6 km || 
|-id=977 bgcolor=#E9E9E9
| 427977 ||  || — || December 30, 2005 || Kitt Peak || Spacewatch || — || align=right | 2.0 km || 
|-id=978 bgcolor=#E9E9E9
| 427978 ||  || — || December 25, 2005 || Mount Lemmon || Mount Lemmon Survey || — || align=right | 1.6 km || 
|-id=979 bgcolor=#E9E9E9
| 427979 ||  || — || December 27, 2005 || Mount Lemmon || Mount Lemmon Survey || MAR || align=right | 1.4 km || 
|-id=980 bgcolor=#E9E9E9
| 427980 ||  || — || December 29, 2005 || Kitt Peak || Spacewatch || — || align=right | 1.3 km || 
|-id=981 bgcolor=#E9E9E9
| 427981 ||  || — || December 30, 2005 || Kitt Peak || Spacewatch || — || align=right data-sort-value="0.91" | 910 m || 
|-id=982 bgcolor=#E9E9E9
| 427982 ||  || — || January 5, 2006 || Mount Lemmon || Mount Lemmon Survey || — || align=right | 1.7 km || 
|-id=983 bgcolor=#E9E9E9
| 427983 ||  || — || January 5, 2006 || Catalina || CSS || — || align=right | 1.6 km || 
|-id=984 bgcolor=#E9E9E9
| 427984 ||  || — || January 5, 2006 || Kitt Peak || Spacewatch || (5) || align=right data-sort-value="0.89" | 890 m || 
|-id=985 bgcolor=#E9E9E9
| 427985 ||  || — || January 7, 2006 || Mount Lemmon || Mount Lemmon Survey || — || align=right | 1.0 km || 
|-id=986 bgcolor=#E9E9E9
| 427986 ||  || — || January 5, 2006 || Kitt Peak || Spacewatch || — || align=right | 1.5 km || 
|-id=987 bgcolor=#E9E9E9
| 427987 ||  || — || January 5, 2006 || Kitt Peak || Spacewatch || — || align=right | 1.2 km || 
|-id=988 bgcolor=#E9E9E9
| 427988 ||  || — || December 25, 2005 || Kitt Peak || Spacewatch || — || align=right | 1.3 km || 
|-id=989 bgcolor=#E9E9E9
| 427989 ||  || — || January 5, 2006 || Kitt Peak || Spacewatch || — || align=right | 1.8 km || 
|-id=990 bgcolor=#E9E9E9
| 427990 ||  || — || January 5, 2006 || Kitt Peak || Spacewatch || — || align=right | 2.0 km || 
|-id=991 bgcolor=#E9E9E9
| 427991 ||  || — || January 4, 2006 || Kitt Peak || Spacewatch || — || align=right | 1.3 km || 
|-id=992 bgcolor=#E9E9E9
| 427992 ||  || — || November 5, 2005 || Kitt Peak || Spacewatch || — || align=right | 2.0 km || 
|-id=993 bgcolor=#E9E9E9
| 427993 ||  || — || January 7, 2006 || Mount Lemmon || Mount Lemmon Survey || — || align=right | 2.4 km || 
|-id=994 bgcolor=#E9E9E9
| 427994 ||  || — || January 20, 2006 || Kitt Peak || Spacewatch || — || align=right | 1.9 km || 
|-id=995 bgcolor=#E9E9E9
| 427995 ||  || — || January 22, 2006 || Mount Lemmon || Mount Lemmon Survey || — || align=right | 1.9 km || 
|-id=996 bgcolor=#E9E9E9
| 427996 ||  || — || January 23, 2006 || Mount Lemmon || Mount Lemmon Survey || — || align=right | 1.4 km || 
|-id=997 bgcolor=#E9E9E9
| 427997 ||  || — || January 20, 2006 || Kitt Peak || Spacewatch || — || align=right | 2.1 km || 
|-id=998 bgcolor=#E9E9E9
| 427998 ||  || — || January 20, 2006 || Kitt Peak || Spacewatch || — || align=right | 1.7 km || 
|-id=999 bgcolor=#E9E9E9
| 427999 ||  || — || January 23, 2006 || Kitt Peak || Spacewatch || — || align=right | 2.2 km || 
|-id=000 bgcolor=#E9E9E9
| 428000 ||  || — || January 23, 2006 || Kitt Peak || Spacewatch || — || align=right | 1.6 km || 
|}

References

External links 
 Discovery Circumstances: Numbered Minor Planets (425001)–(430000) (IAU Minor Planet Center)

0427